

149001–149100 

|-bgcolor=#E9E9E9
| 149001 ||  || — || December 22, 2001 || Socorro || LINEAR || — || align=right | 4.8 km || 
|-id=002 bgcolor=#d6d6d6
| 149002 ||  || — || December 24, 2001 || Palomar || NEAT || — || align=right | 4.4 km || 
|-id=003 bgcolor=#E9E9E9
| 149003 ||  || — || January 4, 2002 || Črni Vrh || Črni Vrh || — || align=right | 3.4 km || 
|-id=004 bgcolor=#d6d6d6
| 149004 ||  || — || January 7, 2002 || Kitt Peak || Spacewatch || KOR || align=right | 2.0 km || 
|-id=005 bgcolor=#d6d6d6
| 149005 ||  || — || January 4, 2002 || Haleakala || NEAT || — || align=right | 7.3 km || 
|-id=006 bgcolor=#d6d6d6
| 149006 ||  || — || January 4, 2002 || Haleakala || NEAT || — || align=right | 5.5 km || 
|-id=007 bgcolor=#d6d6d6
| 149007 ||  || — || January 8, 2002 || Haleakala || NEAT || — || align=right | 4.2 km || 
|-id=008 bgcolor=#E9E9E9
| 149008 ||  || — || January 9, 2002 || Socorro || LINEAR || MRX || align=right | 1.7 km || 
|-id=009 bgcolor=#E9E9E9
| 149009 ||  || — || January 9, 2002 || Socorro || LINEAR || — || align=right | 3.0 km || 
|-id=010 bgcolor=#E9E9E9
| 149010 ||  || — || January 9, 2002 || Socorro || LINEAR || — || align=right | 2.9 km || 
|-id=011 bgcolor=#d6d6d6
| 149011 ||  || — || January 9, 2002 || Socorro || LINEAR || — || align=right | 3.0 km || 
|-id=012 bgcolor=#d6d6d6
| 149012 ||  || — || January 9, 2002 || Socorro || LINEAR || — || align=right | 3.9 km || 
|-id=013 bgcolor=#d6d6d6
| 149013 ||  || — || January 9, 2002 || Socorro || LINEAR || KOR || align=right | 2.3 km || 
|-id=014 bgcolor=#d6d6d6
| 149014 ||  || — || January 9, 2002 || Socorro || LINEAR || — || align=right | 3.8 km || 
|-id=015 bgcolor=#d6d6d6
| 149015 ||  || — || January 9, 2002 || Socorro || LINEAR || — || align=right | 7.0 km || 
|-id=016 bgcolor=#d6d6d6
| 149016 ||  || — || January 11, 2002 || Socorro || LINEAR || — || align=right | 5.3 km || 
|-id=017 bgcolor=#d6d6d6
| 149017 ||  || — || January 11, 2002 || Socorro || LINEAR || — || align=right | 9.3 km || 
|-id=018 bgcolor=#d6d6d6
| 149018 ||  || — || January 8, 2002 || Socorro || LINEAR || — || align=right | 3.8 km || 
|-id=019 bgcolor=#E9E9E9
| 149019 ||  || — || January 9, 2002 || Socorro || LINEAR || — || align=right | 4.0 km || 
|-id=020 bgcolor=#E9E9E9
| 149020 ||  || — || January 9, 2002 || Socorro || LINEAR || — || align=right | 3.7 km || 
|-id=021 bgcolor=#d6d6d6
| 149021 ||  || — || January 8, 2002 || Socorro || LINEAR || EOS || align=right | 2.8 km || 
|-id=022 bgcolor=#d6d6d6
| 149022 ||  || — || January 9, 2002 || Socorro || LINEAR || KOR || align=right | 2.4 km || 
|-id=023 bgcolor=#d6d6d6
| 149023 ||  || — || January 9, 2002 || Socorro || LINEAR || — || align=right | 4.8 km || 
|-id=024 bgcolor=#d6d6d6
| 149024 ||  || — || January 9, 2002 || Socorro || LINEAR || THM || align=right | 5.0 km || 
|-id=025 bgcolor=#d6d6d6
| 149025 ||  || — || January 9, 2002 || Socorro || LINEAR || — || align=right | 3.8 km || 
|-id=026 bgcolor=#d6d6d6
| 149026 ||  || — || January 9, 2002 || Socorro || LINEAR || — || align=right | 5.1 km || 
|-id=027 bgcolor=#d6d6d6
| 149027 ||  || — || January 11, 2002 || Socorro || LINEAR || — || align=right | 4.7 km || 
|-id=028 bgcolor=#fefefe
| 149028 ||  || — || January 14, 2002 || Desert Eagle || W. K. Y. Yeung || H || align=right | 1.7 km || 
|-id=029 bgcolor=#d6d6d6
| 149029 ||  || — || January 14, 2002 || Socorro || LINEAR || — || align=right | 4.1 km || 
|-id=030 bgcolor=#d6d6d6
| 149030 ||  || — || January 14, 2002 || Socorro || LINEAR || — || align=right | 6.6 km || 
|-id=031 bgcolor=#E9E9E9
| 149031 ||  || — || January 13, 2002 || Socorro || LINEAR || — || align=right | 4.1 km || 
|-id=032 bgcolor=#d6d6d6
| 149032 ||  || — || January 13, 2002 || Socorro || LINEAR || — || align=right | 4.2 km || 
|-id=033 bgcolor=#E9E9E9
| 149033 ||  || — || January 15, 2002 || Socorro || LINEAR || — || align=right | 6.9 km || 
|-id=034 bgcolor=#E9E9E9
| 149034 ||  || — || January 14, 2002 || Socorro || LINEAR || GEF || align=right | 2.0 km || 
|-id=035 bgcolor=#d6d6d6
| 149035 ||  || — || January 14, 2002 || Socorro || LINEAR || — || align=right | 4.5 km || 
|-id=036 bgcolor=#d6d6d6
| 149036 ||  || — || January 14, 2002 || Socorro || LINEAR || — || align=right | 5.6 km || 
|-id=037 bgcolor=#d6d6d6
| 149037 ||  || — || January 14, 2002 || Socorro || LINEAR || EOS || align=right | 2.9 km || 
|-id=038 bgcolor=#d6d6d6
| 149038 ||  || — || January 14, 2002 || Socorro || LINEAR || THM || align=right | 3.4 km || 
|-id=039 bgcolor=#E9E9E9
| 149039 ||  || — || January 12, 2002 || Kitt Peak || Spacewatch || — || align=right | 3.6 km || 
|-id=040 bgcolor=#d6d6d6
| 149040 ||  || — || January 12, 2002 || Kitt Peak || Spacewatch || — || align=right | 3.4 km || 
|-id=041 bgcolor=#d6d6d6
| 149041 ||  || — || January 9, 2002 || Socorro || LINEAR || KOR || align=right | 2.0 km || 
|-id=042 bgcolor=#d6d6d6
| 149042 ||  || — || January 8, 2002 || Socorro || LINEAR || — || align=right | 4.3 km || 
|-id=043 bgcolor=#d6d6d6
| 149043 ||  || — || January 9, 2002 || Socorro || LINEAR || — || align=right | 5.2 km || 
|-id=044 bgcolor=#E9E9E9
| 149044 ||  || — || January 18, 2002 || Anderson Mesa || LONEOS || — || align=right | 2.1 km || 
|-id=045 bgcolor=#E9E9E9
| 149045 ||  || — || January 19, 2002 || Anderson Mesa || LONEOS || — || align=right | 4.4 km || 
|-id=046 bgcolor=#d6d6d6
| 149046 ||  || — || January 19, 2002 || Socorro || LINEAR || EOS || align=right | 3.5 km || 
|-id=047 bgcolor=#d6d6d6
| 149047 ||  || — || January 19, 2002 || Socorro || LINEAR || EOS || align=right | 3.2 km || 
|-id=048 bgcolor=#d6d6d6
| 149048 ||  || — || January 19, 2002 || Socorro || LINEAR || KOR || align=right | 2.4 km || 
|-id=049 bgcolor=#d6d6d6
| 149049 ||  || — || January 19, 2002 || Socorro || LINEAR || EOS || align=right | 3.6 km || 
|-id=050 bgcolor=#d6d6d6
| 149050 ||  || — || January 23, 2002 || Socorro || LINEAR || — || align=right | 3.8 km || 
|-id=051 bgcolor=#d6d6d6
| 149051 ||  || — || February 6, 2002 || Desert Eagle || W. K. Y. Yeung || — || align=right | 5.6 km || 
|-id=052 bgcolor=#fefefe
| 149052 ||  || — || February 7, 2002 || Socorro || LINEAR || H || align=right data-sort-value="0.96" | 960 m || 
|-id=053 bgcolor=#d6d6d6
| 149053 ||  || — || February 8, 2002 || Fountain Hills || C. W. Juels, P. R. Holvorcem || — || align=right | 8.0 km || 
|-id=054 bgcolor=#d6d6d6
| 149054 ||  || — || February 6, 2002 || Socorro || LINEAR || KOR || align=right | 2.4 km || 
|-id=055 bgcolor=#d6d6d6
| 149055 ||  || — || February 6, 2002 || Socorro || LINEAR || — || align=right | 4.9 km || 
|-id=056 bgcolor=#d6d6d6
| 149056 ||  || — || February 4, 2002 || Palomar || NEAT || EOS || align=right | 3.8 km || 
|-id=057 bgcolor=#d6d6d6
| 149057 ||  || — || February 6, 2002 || Socorro || LINEAR || — || align=right | 6.3 km || 
|-id=058 bgcolor=#d6d6d6
| 149058 ||  || — || February 6, 2002 || Socorro || LINEAR || — || align=right | 4.5 km || 
|-id=059 bgcolor=#d6d6d6
| 149059 ||  || — || February 6, 2002 || Socorro || LINEAR || — || align=right | 4.3 km || 
|-id=060 bgcolor=#d6d6d6
| 149060 ||  || — || February 12, 2002 || Desert Eagle || W. K. Y. Yeung || EOS || align=right | 3.5 km || 
|-id=061 bgcolor=#d6d6d6
| 149061 ||  || — || February 7, 2002 || Socorro || LINEAR || HYG || align=right | 4.8 km || 
|-id=062 bgcolor=#d6d6d6
| 149062 ||  || — || February 12, 2002 || Desert Eagle || W. K. Y. Yeung || THM || align=right | 3.9 km || 
|-id=063 bgcolor=#d6d6d6
| 149063 ||  || — || February 12, 2002 || Desert Eagle || W. K. Y. Yeung || — || align=right | 5.0 km || 
|-id=064 bgcolor=#d6d6d6
| 149064 ||  || — || February 6, 2002 || Socorro || LINEAR || — || align=right | 4.7 km || 
|-id=065 bgcolor=#d6d6d6
| 149065 ||  || — || February 7, 2002 || Socorro || LINEAR || — || align=right | 4.1 km || 
|-id=066 bgcolor=#d6d6d6
| 149066 ||  || — || February 7, 2002 || Socorro || LINEAR || KOR || align=right | 2.1 km || 
|-id=067 bgcolor=#d6d6d6
| 149067 ||  || — || February 7, 2002 || Socorro || LINEAR || EOS || align=right | 2.9 km || 
|-id=068 bgcolor=#d6d6d6
| 149068 ||  || — || February 7, 2002 || Socorro || LINEAR || EOS || align=right | 3.2 km || 
|-id=069 bgcolor=#d6d6d6
| 149069 ||  || — || February 7, 2002 || Socorro || LINEAR || — || align=right | 3.6 km || 
|-id=070 bgcolor=#d6d6d6
| 149070 ||  || — || February 7, 2002 || Socorro || LINEAR || EOS || align=right | 3.1 km || 
|-id=071 bgcolor=#d6d6d6
| 149071 ||  || — || February 7, 2002 || Socorro || LINEAR || — || align=right | 3.1 km || 
|-id=072 bgcolor=#d6d6d6
| 149072 ||  || — || February 7, 2002 || Socorro || LINEAR || — || align=right | 4.9 km || 
|-id=073 bgcolor=#d6d6d6
| 149073 ||  || — || February 7, 2002 || Socorro || LINEAR || KOR || align=right | 2.6 km || 
|-id=074 bgcolor=#d6d6d6
| 149074 ||  || — || February 7, 2002 || Socorro || LINEAR || — || align=right | 5.0 km || 
|-id=075 bgcolor=#d6d6d6
| 149075 ||  || — || February 7, 2002 || Socorro || LINEAR || — || align=right | 4.6 km || 
|-id=076 bgcolor=#d6d6d6
| 149076 ||  || — || February 7, 2002 || Socorro || LINEAR || — || align=right | 4.7 km || 
|-id=077 bgcolor=#d6d6d6
| 149077 ||  || — || February 7, 2002 || Socorro || LINEAR || — || align=right | 3.6 km || 
|-id=078 bgcolor=#d6d6d6
| 149078 ||  || — || February 7, 2002 || Socorro || LINEAR || — || align=right | 5.4 km || 
|-id=079 bgcolor=#d6d6d6
| 149079 ||  || — || February 7, 2002 || Socorro || LINEAR || — || align=right | 6.1 km || 
|-id=080 bgcolor=#d6d6d6
| 149080 ||  || — || February 7, 2002 || Socorro || LINEAR || — || align=right | 4.2 km || 
|-id=081 bgcolor=#d6d6d6
| 149081 ||  || — || February 7, 2002 || Socorro || LINEAR || — || align=right | 3.8 km || 
|-id=082 bgcolor=#d6d6d6
| 149082 ||  || — || February 7, 2002 || Socorro || LINEAR || THM || align=right | 5.8 km || 
|-id=083 bgcolor=#d6d6d6
| 149083 ||  || — || February 7, 2002 || Socorro || LINEAR || — || align=right | 4.2 km || 
|-id=084 bgcolor=#d6d6d6
| 149084 ||  || — || February 7, 2002 || Socorro || LINEAR || THM || align=right | 4.1 km || 
|-id=085 bgcolor=#d6d6d6
| 149085 ||  || — || February 8, 2002 || Socorro || LINEAR || — || align=right | 3.2 km || 
|-id=086 bgcolor=#d6d6d6
| 149086 ||  || — || February 15, 2002 || Uccle || E. W. Elst, H. Debehogne || EOS || align=right | 3.7 km || 
|-id=087 bgcolor=#d6d6d6
| 149087 ||  || — || February 7, 2002 || Socorro || LINEAR || BRA || align=right | 2.1 km || 
|-id=088 bgcolor=#d6d6d6
| 149088 ||  || — || February 7, 2002 || Socorro || LINEAR || NAE || align=right | 5.1 km || 
|-id=089 bgcolor=#d6d6d6
| 149089 ||  || — || February 7, 2002 || Socorro || LINEAR || — || align=right | 4.0 km || 
|-id=090 bgcolor=#d6d6d6
| 149090 ||  || — || February 7, 2002 || Socorro || LINEAR || KOR || align=right | 2.1 km || 
|-id=091 bgcolor=#d6d6d6
| 149091 ||  || — || February 8, 2002 || Socorro || LINEAR || URS || align=right | 5.8 km || 
|-id=092 bgcolor=#d6d6d6
| 149092 ||  || — || February 9, 2002 || Socorro || LINEAR || TEL || align=right | 2.4 km || 
|-id=093 bgcolor=#d6d6d6
| 149093 ||  || — || February 9, 2002 || Socorro || LINEAR || — || align=right | 6.2 km || 
|-id=094 bgcolor=#d6d6d6
| 149094 ||  || — || February 6, 2002 || Socorro || LINEAR || HYG || align=right | 4.6 km || 
|-id=095 bgcolor=#d6d6d6
| 149095 ||  || — || February 7, 2002 || Socorro || LINEAR || KOR || align=right | 2.1 km || 
|-id=096 bgcolor=#d6d6d6
| 149096 ||  || — || February 7, 2002 || Socorro || LINEAR || — || align=right | 4.2 km || 
|-id=097 bgcolor=#d6d6d6
| 149097 ||  || — || February 7, 2002 || Socorro || LINEAR || — || align=right | 6.5 km || 
|-id=098 bgcolor=#E9E9E9
| 149098 ||  || — || February 8, 2002 || Socorro || LINEAR || INO || align=right | 4.8 km || 
|-id=099 bgcolor=#d6d6d6
| 149099 ||  || — || February 8, 2002 || Socorro || LINEAR || — || align=right | 4.4 km || 
|-id=100 bgcolor=#d6d6d6
| 149100 ||  || — || February 8, 2002 || Socorro || LINEAR || — || align=right | 4.9 km || 
|}

149101–149200 

|-bgcolor=#E9E9E9
| 149101 ||  || — || February 10, 2002 || Socorro || LINEAR || — || align=right | 3.4 km || 
|-id=102 bgcolor=#d6d6d6
| 149102 ||  || — || February 10, 2002 || Socorro || LINEAR || — || align=right | 3.7 km || 
|-id=103 bgcolor=#d6d6d6
| 149103 ||  || — || February 10, 2002 || Socorro || LINEAR || HYG || align=right | 4.4 km || 
|-id=104 bgcolor=#d6d6d6
| 149104 ||  || — || February 10, 2002 || Socorro || LINEAR || EOS || align=right | 3.6 km || 
|-id=105 bgcolor=#d6d6d6
| 149105 ||  || — || February 10, 2002 || Socorro || LINEAR || — || align=right | 3.8 km || 
|-id=106 bgcolor=#d6d6d6
| 149106 ||  || — || February 10, 2002 || Socorro || LINEAR || slow || align=right | 5.0 km || 
|-id=107 bgcolor=#d6d6d6
| 149107 ||  || — || February 10, 2002 || Socorro || LINEAR || — || align=right | 5.3 km || 
|-id=108 bgcolor=#d6d6d6
| 149108 ||  || — || February 10, 2002 || Socorro || LINEAR || — || align=right | 4.2 km || 
|-id=109 bgcolor=#d6d6d6
| 149109 ||  || — || February 10, 2002 || Socorro || LINEAR || — || align=right | 4.6 km || 
|-id=110 bgcolor=#d6d6d6
| 149110 ||  || — || February 10, 2002 || Socorro || LINEAR || HYG || align=right | 4.1 km || 
|-id=111 bgcolor=#d6d6d6
| 149111 ||  || — || February 10, 2002 || Socorro || LINEAR || HYG || align=right | 5.0 km || 
|-id=112 bgcolor=#d6d6d6
| 149112 ||  || — || February 11, 2002 || Socorro || LINEAR || CRO || align=right | 5.7 km || 
|-id=113 bgcolor=#d6d6d6
| 149113 Stewartbushman ||  ||  || February 6, 2002 || Kitt Peak || M. W. Buie || — || align=right | 4.0 km || 
|-id=114 bgcolor=#d6d6d6
| 149114 ||  || — || February 7, 2002 || Palomar || NEAT || — || align=right | 6.0 km || 
|-id=115 bgcolor=#d6d6d6
| 149115 Lauriecantillo ||  ||  || February 8, 2002 || Kitt Peak || M. W. Buie || EOS || align=right | 2.7 km || 
|-id=116 bgcolor=#d6d6d6
| 149116 ||  || — || February 9, 2002 || Kitt Peak || Spacewatch || KOR || align=right | 2.6 km || 
|-id=117 bgcolor=#d6d6d6
| 149117 ||  || — || February 11, 2002 || Socorro || LINEAR || — || align=right | 3.1 km || 
|-id=118 bgcolor=#d6d6d6
| 149118 ||  || — || February 8, 2002 || Socorro || LINEAR || — || align=right | 4.7 km || 
|-id=119 bgcolor=#d6d6d6
| 149119 || 2002 DX || — || February 16, 2002 || Bohyunsan || Bohyunsan Obs. || — || align=right | 4.7 km || 
|-id=120 bgcolor=#fefefe
| 149120 ||  || — || February 19, 2002 || Socorro || LINEAR || H || align=right | 1.0 km || 
|-id=121 bgcolor=#d6d6d6
| 149121 ||  || — || February 19, 2002 || Socorro || LINEAR || — || align=right | 5.6 km || 
|-id=122 bgcolor=#d6d6d6
| 149122 ||  || — || March 14, 2002 || Desert Eagle || W. K. Y. Yeung || — || align=right | 4.9 km || 
|-id=123 bgcolor=#d6d6d6
| 149123 ||  || — || March 6, 2002 || Palomar || NEAT || — || align=right | 5.0 km || 
|-id=124 bgcolor=#d6d6d6
| 149124 ||  || — || March 9, 2002 || Palomar || NEAT || — || align=right | 4.9 km || 
|-id=125 bgcolor=#d6d6d6
| 149125 ||  || — || March 5, 2002 || Kitt Peak || Spacewatch || — || align=right | 3.6 km || 
|-id=126 bgcolor=#d6d6d6
| 149126 ||  || — || March 10, 2002 || Anderson Mesa || LONEOS || — || align=right | 4.1 km || 
|-id=127 bgcolor=#d6d6d6
| 149127 ||  || — || March 9, 2002 || Socorro || LINEAR || — || align=right | 5.4 km || 
|-id=128 bgcolor=#d6d6d6
| 149128 ||  || — || March 9, 2002 || Socorro || LINEAR || — || align=right | 3.6 km || 
|-id=129 bgcolor=#d6d6d6
| 149129 ||  || — || March 12, 2002 || Palomar || NEAT || HYG || align=right | 4.3 km || 
|-id=130 bgcolor=#d6d6d6
| 149130 ||  || — || March 9, 2002 || Socorro || LINEAR || THM || align=right | 4.4 km || 
|-id=131 bgcolor=#d6d6d6
| 149131 ||  || — || March 13, 2002 || Socorro || LINEAR || KOR || align=right | 2.5 km || 
|-id=132 bgcolor=#d6d6d6
| 149132 ||  || — || March 13, 2002 || Socorro || LINEAR || — || align=right | 5.9 km || 
|-id=133 bgcolor=#d6d6d6
| 149133 ||  || — || March 13, 2002 || Socorro || LINEAR || — || align=right | 3.2 km || 
|-id=134 bgcolor=#d6d6d6
| 149134 ||  || — || March 13, 2002 || Socorro || LINEAR || — || align=right | 3.4 km || 
|-id=135 bgcolor=#d6d6d6
| 149135 ||  || — || March 13, 2002 || Socorro || LINEAR || — || align=right | 6.7 km || 
|-id=136 bgcolor=#d6d6d6
| 149136 ||  || — || March 13, 2002 || Socorro || LINEAR || — || align=right | 4.5 km || 
|-id=137 bgcolor=#d6d6d6
| 149137 ||  || — || March 9, 2002 || Socorro || LINEAR || — || align=right | 6.4 km || 
|-id=138 bgcolor=#d6d6d6
| 149138 ||  || — || March 12, 2002 || Socorro || LINEAR || — || align=right | 5.0 km || 
|-id=139 bgcolor=#d6d6d6
| 149139 ||  || — || March 14, 2002 || Socorro || LINEAR || — || align=right | 4.3 km || 
|-id=140 bgcolor=#d6d6d6
| 149140 ||  || — || March 14, 2002 || Socorro || LINEAR || HYG || align=right | 3.7 km || 
|-id=141 bgcolor=#d6d6d6
| 149141 ||  || — || March 9, 2002 || Anderson Mesa || LONEOS || VER || align=right | 5.9 km || 
|-id=142 bgcolor=#d6d6d6
| 149142 ||  || — || March 9, 2002 || Anderson Mesa || LONEOS || — || align=right | 5.3 km || 
|-id=143 bgcolor=#d6d6d6
| 149143 ||  || — || March 9, 2002 || Anderson Mesa || LONEOS || HYG || align=right | 4.8 km || 
|-id=144 bgcolor=#d6d6d6
| 149144 ||  || — || March 9, 2002 || Kitt Peak || Spacewatch || — || align=right | 5.1 km || 
|-id=145 bgcolor=#d6d6d6
| 149145 ||  || — || March 11, 2002 || Kitt Peak || Spacewatch || — || align=right | 3.4 km || 
|-id=146 bgcolor=#d6d6d6
| 149146 ||  || — || March 10, 2002 || Kitt Peak || Spacewatch || — || align=right | 6.9 km || 
|-id=147 bgcolor=#d6d6d6
| 149147 ||  || — || March 13, 2002 || Kitt Peak || Spacewatch || — || align=right | 4.0 km || 
|-id=148 bgcolor=#d6d6d6
| 149148 ||  || — || March 13, 2002 || Socorro || LINEAR || — || align=right | 5.0 km || 
|-id=149 bgcolor=#d6d6d6
| 149149 ||  || — || March 12, 2002 || Palomar || NEAT || — || align=right | 3.8 km || 
|-id=150 bgcolor=#d6d6d6
| 149150 ||  || — || March 12, 2002 || Palomar || NEAT || — || align=right | 4.0 km || 
|-id=151 bgcolor=#d6d6d6
| 149151 ||  || — || March 15, 2002 || Palomar || NEAT || — || align=right | 4.9 km || 
|-id=152 bgcolor=#d6d6d6
| 149152 ||  || — || March 15, 2002 || Palomar || NEAT || — || align=right | 4.5 km || 
|-id=153 bgcolor=#d6d6d6
| 149153 || 2002 FK || — || March 16, 2002 || Desert Eagle || W. K. Y. Yeung || HYG || align=right | 6.0 km || 
|-id=154 bgcolor=#d6d6d6
| 149154 ||  || — || March 16, 2002 || Socorro || LINEAR || THM || align=right | 3.1 km || 
|-id=155 bgcolor=#d6d6d6
| 149155 ||  || — || March 16, 2002 || Socorro || LINEAR || — || align=right | 6.5 km || 
|-id=156 bgcolor=#d6d6d6
| 149156 ||  || — || March 19, 2002 || Palomar || NEAT || — || align=right | 6.4 km || 
|-id=157 bgcolor=#d6d6d6
| 149157 Stephencarr ||  ||  || March 20, 2002 || Kitt Peak || M. W. Buie || HYG || align=right | 3.2 km || 
|-id=158 bgcolor=#d6d6d6
| 149158 ||  || — || March 20, 2002 || Socorro || LINEAR || — || align=right | 6.0 km || 
|-id=159 bgcolor=#d6d6d6
| 149159 ||  || — || March 20, 2002 || Socorro || LINEAR || AEG || align=right | 5.2 km || 
|-id=160 bgcolor=#E9E9E9
| 149160 Geojih || 2002 GE ||  || April 1, 2002 || Kleť || KLENOT || HOF || align=right | 5.4 km || 
|-id=161 bgcolor=#fefefe
| 149161 ||  || — || April 10, 2002 || Socorro || LINEAR || H || align=right | 1.3 km || 
|-id=162 bgcolor=#fefefe
| 149162 ||  || — || April 10, 2002 || Socorro || LINEAR || H || align=right | 1.1 km || 
|-id=163 bgcolor=#d6d6d6
| 149163 Stevenconard ||  ||  || April 7, 2002 || Cerro Tololo || M. W. Buie || — || align=right | 6.7 km || 
|-id=164 bgcolor=#d6d6d6
| 149164 ||  || — || April 2, 2002 || Palomar || NEAT || HYG || align=right | 4.4 km || 
|-id=165 bgcolor=#d6d6d6
| 149165 ||  || — || April 5, 2002 || Anderson Mesa || LONEOS || — || align=right | 5.8 km || 
|-id=166 bgcolor=#d6d6d6
| 149166 ||  || — || April 9, 2002 || Kitt Peak || Spacewatch || MEL || align=right | 5.2 km || 
|-id=167 bgcolor=#d6d6d6
| 149167 ||  || — || April 11, 2002 || Anderson Mesa || LONEOS || — || align=right | 4.6 km || 
|-id=168 bgcolor=#d6d6d6
| 149168 ||  || — || April 11, 2002 || Palomar || NEAT || URS || align=right | 5.5 km || 
|-id=169 bgcolor=#d6d6d6
| 149169 ||  || — || April 10, 2002 || Socorro || LINEAR || HYG || align=right | 5.1 km || 
|-id=170 bgcolor=#d6d6d6
| 149170 ||  || — || April 10, 2002 || Socorro || LINEAR || HYG || align=right | 5.3 km || 
|-id=171 bgcolor=#d6d6d6
| 149171 ||  || — || April 13, 2002 || Palomar || NEAT || — || align=right | 5.2 km || 
|-id=172 bgcolor=#d6d6d6
| 149172 ||  || — || April 13, 2002 || Palomar || NEAT || HYG || align=right | 4.2 km || 
|-id=173 bgcolor=#d6d6d6
| 149173 ||  || — || April 22, 2002 || Socorro || LINEAR || EUP || align=right | 6.6 km || 
|-id=174 bgcolor=#d6d6d6
| 149174 ||  || — || May 5, 2002 || Socorro || LINEAR || EUP || align=right | 6.9 km || 
|-id=175 bgcolor=#fefefe
| 149175 ||  || — || May 5, 2002 || Socorro || LINEAR || H || align=right | 1.4 km || 
|-id=176 bgcolor=#fefefe
| 149176 ||  || — || May 4, 2002 || Socorro || LINEAR || H || align=right | 1.6 km || 
|-id=177 bgcolor=#d6d6d6
| 149177 ||  || — || May 5, 2002 || Socorro || LINEAR || EUP || align=right | 8.8 km || 
|-id=178 bgcolor=#d6d6d6
| 149178 ||  || — || May 8, 2002 || Socorro || LINEAR || — || align=right | 5.2 km || 
|-id=179 bgcolor=#d6d6d6
| 149179 ||  || — || May 8, 2002 || Socorro || LINEAR || HYG || align=right | 6.3 km || 
|-id=180 bgcolor=#d6d6d6
| 149180 ||  || — || May 9, 2002 || Socorro || LINEAR || — || align=right | 6.2 km || 
|-id=181 bgcolor=#fefefe
| 149181 ||  || — || May 8, 2002 || Socorro || LINEAR || — || align=right | 2.3 km || 
|-id=182 bgcolor=#d6d6d6
| 149182 ||  || — || May 7, 2002 || Socorro || LINEAR || EUP || align=right | 6.4 km || 
|-id=183 bgcolor=#d6d6d6
| 149183 ||  || — || May 11, 2002 || Socorro || LINEAR || — || align=right | 5.3 km || 
|-id=184 bgcolor=#d6d6d6
| 149184 ||  || — || May 11, 2002 || Socorro || LINEAR || — || align=right | 5.1 km || 
|-id=185 bgcolor=#fefefe
| 149185 ||  || — || May 12, 2002 || Socorro || LINEAR || — || align=right | 1.3 km || 
|-id=186 bgcolor=#fefefe
| 149186 ||  || — || May 6, 2002 || Socorro || LINEAR || H || align=right | 1.3 km || 
|-id=187 bgcolor=#fefefe
| 149187 ||  || — || May 5, 2002 || Kitt Peak || Spacewatch || FLO || align=right data-sort-value="0.86" | 860 m || 
|-id=188 bgcolor=#d6d6d6
| 149188 ||  || — || May 13, 2002 || Palomar || NEAT || — || align=right | 5.3 km || 
|-id=189 bgcolor=#d6d6d6
| 149189 ||  || — || May 28, 2002 || Palomar || NEAT || — || align=right | 7.5 km || 
|-id=190 bgcolor=#fefefe
| 149190 ||  || — || June 5, 2002 || Socorro || LINEAR || — || align=right | 1.0 km || 
|-id=191 bgcolor=#fefefe
| 149191 ||  || — || June 5, 2002 || Socorro || LINEAR || FLO || align=right data-sort-value="0.96" | 960 m || 
|-id=192 bgcolor=#fefefe
| 149192 ||  || — || June 6, 2002 || Socorro || LINEAR || — || align=right | 1.5 km || 
|-id=193 bgcolor=#FA8072
| 149193 ||  || — || June 8, 2002 || Socorro || LINEAR || — || align=right | 2.1 km || 
|-id=194 bgcolor=#fefefe
| 149194 ||  || — || July 12, 2002 || Palomar || NEAT || V || align=right | 1.0 km || 
|-id=195 bgcolor=#fefefe
| 149195 || 2002 PH || — || August 1, 2002 || Campo Imperatore || CINEOS || — || align=right data-sort-value="0.83" | 830 m || 
|-id=196 bgcolor=#fefefe
| 149196 ||  || — || August 6, 2002 || Palomar || NEAT || V || align=right data-sort-value="0.83" | 830 m || 
|-id=197 bgcolor=#fefefe
| 149197 ||  || — || August 6, 2002 || Palomar || NEAT || — || align=right data-sort-value="0.95" | 950 m || 
|-id=198 bgcolor=#fefefe
| 149198 ||  || — || August 6, 2002 || Palomar || NEAT || — || align=right data-sort-value="0.98" | 980 m || 
|-id=199 bgcolor=#fefefe
| 149199 ||  || — || August 5, 2002 || Socorro || LINEAR || — || align=right | 1.7 km || 
|-id=200 bgcolor=#fefefe
| 149200 ||  || — || August 5, 2002 || Socorro || LINEAR || — || align=right | 1.3 km || 
|}

149201–149300 

|-bgcolor=#fefefe
| 149201 ||  || — || August 5, 2002 || Socorro || LINEAR || ERI || align=right | 2.8 km || 
|-id=202 bgcolor=#fefefe
| 149202 ||  || — || August 8, 2002 || Palomar || NEAT || — || align=right | 1.1 km || 
|-id=203 bgcolor=#fefefe
| 149203 ||  || — || August 12, 2002 || Socorro || LINEAR || FLO || align=right | 1.3 km || 
|-id=204 bgcolor=#fefefe
| 149204 ||  || — || August 10, 2002 || Socorro || LINEAR || — || align=right | 2.5 km || 
|-id=205 bgcolor=#E9E9E9
| 149205 ||  || — || August 13, 2002 || Anderson Mesa || LONEOS || — || align=right | 1.8 km || 
|-id=206 bgcolor=#E9E9E9
| 149206 ||  || — || August 15, 2002 || Anderson Mesa || LONEOS || — || align=right | 2.3 km || 
|-id=207 bgcolor=#fefefe
| 149207 ||  || — || August 15, 2002 || Socorro || LINEAR || — || align=right | 1.0 km || 
|-id=208 bgcolor=#fefefe
| 149208 ||  || — || August 8, 2002 || Palomar || S. F. Hönig || NYS || align=right data-sort-value="0.84" | 840 m || 
|-id=209 bgcolor=#fefefe
| 149209 ||  || — || August 8, 2002 || Palomar || S. F. Hönig || — || align=right data-sort-value="0.78" | 780 m || 
|-id=210 bgcolor=#fefefe
| 149210 ||  || — || August 28, 2002 || Palomar || NEAT || — || align=right data-sort-value="0.83" | 830 m || 
|-id=211 bgcolor=#fefefe
| 149211 ||  || — || August 29, 2002 || Palomar || NEAT || — || align=right | 1.4 km || 
|-id=212 bgcolor=#fefefe
| 149212 ||  || — || August 26, 2002 || Palomar || NEAT || — || align=right | 1.2 km || 
|-id=213 bgcolor=#fefefe
| 149213 ||  || — || August 28, 2002 || Palomar || NEAT || — || align=right data-sort-value="0.96" | 960 m || 
|-id=214 bgcolor=#fefefe
| 149214 ||  || — || August 30, 2002 || Palomar || NEAT || — || align=right | 1.3 km || 
|-id=215 bgcolor=#fefefe
| 149215 ||  || — || September 4, 2002 || Anderson Mesa || LONEOS || — || align=right | 1.2 km || 
|-id=216 bgcolor=#E9E9E9
| 149216 ||  || — || September 4, 2002 || Anderson Mesa || LONEOS || — || align=right | 2.2 km || 
|-id=217 bgcolor=#fefefe
| 149217 ||  || — || September 4, 2002 || Anderson Mesa || LONEOS || — || align=right | 1.3 km || 
|-id=218 bgcolor=#fefefe
| 149218 ||  || — || September 4, 2002 || Anderson Mesa || LONEOS || — || align=right | 1.3 km || 
|-id=219 bgcolor=#fefefe
| 149219 ||  || — || September 4, 2002 || Anderson Mesa || LONEOS || FLO || align=right | 1.3 km || 
|-id=220 bgcolor=#fefefe
| 149220 ||  || — || September 5, 2002 || Anderson Mesa || LONEOS || — || align=right | 2.9 km || 
|-id=221 bgcolor=#fefefe
| 149221 ||  || — || September 5, 2002 || Socorro || LINEAR || — || align=right | 1.7 km || 
|-id=222 bgcolor=#fefefe
| 149222 ||  || — || September 5, 2002 || Socorro || LINEAR || — || align=right | 1.5 km || 
|-id=223 bgcolor=#FA8072
| 149223 ||  || — || September 5, 2002 || Socorro || LINEAR || — || align=right | 1.7 km || 
|-id=224 bgcolor=#fefefe
| 149224 ||  || — || September 5, 2002 || Socorro || LINEAR || MAS || align=right data-sort-value="0.93" | 930 m || 
|-id=225 bgcolor=#fefefe
| 149225 ||  || — || September 5, 2002 || Socorro || LINEAR || V || align=right | 1.6 km || 
|-id=226 bgcolor=#fefefe
| 149226 ||  || — || September 5, 2002 || Socorro || LINEAR || — || align=right | 1.1 km || 
|-id=227 bgcolor=#fefefe
| 149227 ||  || — || September 5, 2002 || Socorro || LINEAR || — || align=right | 1.3 km || 
|-id=228 bgcolor=#fefefe
| 149228 ||  || — || September 5, 2002 || Socorro || LINEAR || — || align=right | 2.2 km || 
|-id=229 bgcolor=#fefefe
| 149229 ||  || — || September 5, 2002 || Socorro || LINEAR || V || align=right | 1.3 km || 
|-id=230 bgcolor=#fefefe
| 149230 ||  || — || September 5, 2002 || Haleakala || NEAT || — || align=right | 2.4 km || 
|-id=231 bgcolor=#fefefe
| 149231 ||  || — || September 6, 2002 || Socorro || LINEAR || — || align=right | 1.6 km || 
|-id=232 bgcolor=#fefefe
| 149232 ||  || — || September 5, 2002 || Anderson Mesa || LONEOS || — || align=right | 1.5 km || 
|-id=233 bgcolor=#fefefe
| 149233 ||  || — || September 7, 2002 || Campo Imperatore || CINEOS || — || align=right | 1.2 km || 
|-id=234 bgcolor=#fefefe
| 149234 ||  || — || September 10, 2002 || Haleakala || NEAT || — || align=right data-sort-value="0.98" | 980 m || 
|-id=235 bgcolor=#fefefe
| 149235 ||  || — || September 11, 2002 || Haleakala || NEAT || FLO || align=right | 1.4 km || 
|-id=236 bgcolor=#fefefe
| 149236 ||  || — || September 11, 2002 || Palomar || NEAT || — || align=right | 1.1 km || 
|-id=237 bgcolor=#fefefe
| 149237 ||  || — || September 13, 2002 || Anderson Mesa || LONEOS || ERI || align=right | 3.0 km || 
|-id=238 bgcolor=#fefefe
| 149238 ||  || — || September 14, 2002 || Palomar || NEAT || — || align=right | 3.2 km || 
|-id=239 bgcolor=#fefefe
| 149239 ||  || — || September 12, 2002 || Palomar || NEAT || FLO || align=right data-sort-value="0.96" | 960 m || 
|-id=240 bgcolor=#fefefe
| 149240 ||  || — || September 14, 2002 || Haleakala || NEAT || — || align=right | 1.5 km || 
|-id=241 bgcolor=#fefefe
| 149241 ||  || — || September 15, 2002 || Kitt Peak || Spacewatch || — || align=right | 1.9 km || 
|-id=242 bgcolor=#fefefe
| 149242 ||  || — || September 13, 2002 || Anderson Mesa || LONEOS || — || align=right | 1.2 km || 
|-id=243 bgcolor=#fefefe
| 149243 Dorothynorton ||  ||  || September 14, 2002 || Palomar || R. Matson || NYS || align=right | 1.1 km || 
|-id=244 bgcolor=#fefefe
| 149244 Kriegh ||  ||  || September 14, 2002 || Palomar || R. Matson || — || align=right data-sort-value="0.99" | 990 m || 
|-id=245 bgcolor=#E9E9E9
| 149245 ||  || — || September 27, 2002 || Palomar || NEAT || — || align=right | 2.1 km || 
|-id=246 bgcolor=#fefefe
| 149246 ||  || — || September 30, 2002 || Socorro || LINEAR || — || align=right | 1.1 km || 
|-id=247 bgcolor=#E9E9E9
| 149247 ||  || — || September 30, 2002 || Socorro || LINEAR || — || align=right | 1.5 km || 
|-id=248 bgcolor=#fefefe
| 149248 ||  || — || September 29, 2002 || Kitt Peak || Spacewatch || — || align=right | 1.2 km || 
|-id=249 bgcolor=#fefefe
| 149249 ||  || — || September 29, 2002 || Haleakala || NEAT || — || align=right | 1.1 km || 
|-id=250 bgcolor=#E9E9E9
| 149250 ||  || — || September 30, 2002 || Socorro || LINEAR || — || align=right | 5.8 km || 
|-id=251 bgcolor=#fefefe
| 149251 ||  || — || September 30, 2002 || Haleakala || NEAT || — || align=right | 3.0 km || 
|-id=252 bgcolor=#fefefe
| 149252 || 2002 TJ || — || October 1, 2002 || Anderson Mesa || LONEOS || — || align=right | 1.1 km || 
|-id=253 bgcolor=#fefefe
| 149253 ||  || — || October 1, 2002 || Socorro || LINEAR || — || align=right | 1.5 km || 
|-id=254 bgcolor=#fefefe
| 149254 ||  || — || October 1, 2002 || Socorro || LINEAR || — || align=right | 1.5 km || 
|-id=255 bgcolor=#fefefe
| 149255 ||  || — || October 1, 2002 || Haleakala || NEAT || — || align=right | 1.3 km || 
|-id=256 bgcolor=#fefefe
| 149256 ||  || — || October 1, 2002 || Anderson Mesa || LONEOS || V || align=right data-sort-value="0.95" | 950 m || 
|-id=257 bgcolor=#fefefe
| 149257 ||  || — || October 2, 2002 || Socorro || LINEAR || — || align=right | 1.4 km || 
|-id=258 bgcolor=#fefefe
| 149258 ||  || — || October 2, 2002 || Socorro || LINEAR || — || align=right | 1.5 km || 
|-id=259 bgcolor=#E9E9E9
| 149259 ||  || — || October 2, 2002 || Socorro || LINEAR || — || align=right | 1.9 km || 
|-id=260 bgcolor=#fefefe
| 149260 ||  || — || October 2, 2002 || Socorro || LINEAR || — || align=right | 1.8 km || 
|-id=261 bgcolor=#fefefe
| 149261 ||  || — || October 2, 2002 || Socorro || LINEAR || — || align=right | 1.5 km || 
|-id=262 bgcolor=#E9E9E9
| 149262 ||  || — || October 2, 2002 || Socorro || LINEAR || — || align=right | 4.2 km || 
|-id=263 bgcolor=#fefefe
| 149263 ||  || — || October 2, 2002 || Socorro || LINEAR || V || align=right | 1.3 km || 
|-id=264 bgcolor=#fefefe
| 149264 ||  || — || October 2, 2002 || Haleakala || NEAT || V || align=right | 1.3 km || 
|-id=265 bgcolor=#fefefe
| 149265 ||  || — || October 2, 2002 || Socorro || LINEAR || — || align=right | 3.6 km || 
|-id=266 bgcolor=#fefefe
| 149266 ||  || — || October 2, 2002 || Socorro || LINEAR || NYS || align=right data-sort-value="0.91" | 910 m || 
|-id=267 bgcolor=#fefefe
| 149267 ||  || — || October 1, 2002 || Anderson Mesa || LONEOS || PHO || align=right | 2.0 km || 
|-id=268 bgcolor=#fefefe
| 149268 ||  || — || October 2, 2002 || Needville || Needville Obs. || FLO || align=right data-sort-value="0.82" | 820 m || 
|-id=269 bgcolor=#fefefe
| 149269 ||  || — || October 2, 2002 || Needville || Needville Obs. || V || align=right | 1.1 km || 
|-id=270 bgcolor=#fefefe
| 149270 ||  || — || October 2, 2002 || Campo Imperatore || CINEOS || — || align=right | 1.5 km || 
|-id=271 bgcolor=#fefefe
| 149271 ||  || — || October 3, 2002 || Palomar || NEAT || V || align=right | 1.0 km || 
|-id=272 bgcolor=#fefefe
| 149272 ||  || — || October 1, 2002 || Anderson Mesa || LONEOS || — || align=right | 1.0 km || 
|-id=273 bgcolor=#fefefe
| 149273 ||  || — || October 1, 2002 || Socorro || LINEAR || V || align=right | 1.4 km || 
|-id=274 bgcolor=#fefefe
| 149274 ||  || — || October 1, 2002 || Socorro || LINEAR || — || align=right | 1.6 km || 
|-id=275 bgcolor=#fefefe
| 149275 ||  || — || October 4, 2002 || Socorro || LINEAR || — || align=right | 1.3 km || 
|-id=276 bgcolor=#fefefe
| 149276 ||  || — || October 2, 2002 || Haleakala || NEAT || — || align=right | 1.0 km || 
|-id=277 bgcolor=#fefefe
| 149277 ||  || — || October 3, 2002 || Palomar || NEAT || FLO || align=right | 1.9 km || 
|-id=278 bgcolor=#fefefe
| 149278 ||  || — || October 3, 2002 || Palomar || NEAT || — || align=right | 2.8 km || 
|-id=279 bgcolor=#fefefe
| 149279 ||  || — || October 3, 2002 || Palomar || NEAT || — || align=right | 1.3 km || 
|-id=280 bgcolor=#fefefe
| 149280 ||  || — || October 4, 2002 || Socorro || LINEAR || — || align=right | 1.3 km || 
|-id=281 bgcolor=#fefefe
| 149281 ||  || — || October 4, 2002 || Palomar || NEAT || V || align=right | 1.3 km || 
|-id=282 bgcolor=#fefefe
| 149282 ||  || — || October 4, 2002 || Anderson Mesa || LONEOS || V || align=right data-sort-value="0.94" | 940 m || 
|-id=283 bgcolor=#fefefe
| 149283 ||  || — || October 4, 2002 || Socorro || LINEAR || — || align=right | 1.2 km || 
|-id=284 bgcolor=#fefefe
| 149284 ||  || — || October 4, 2002 || Socorro || LINEAR || V || align=right | 1.1 km || 
|-id=285 bgcolor=#fefefe
| 149285 ||  || — || October 4, 2002 || Socorro || LINEAR || — || align=right | 1.4 km || 
|-id=286 bgcolor=#fefefe
| 149286 ||  || — || October 4, 2002 || Socorro || LINEAR || — || align=right | 1.3 km || 
|-id=287 bgcolor=#fefefe
| 149287 ||  || — || October 4, 2002 || Socorro || LINEAR || FLO || align=right | 1.3 km || 
|-id=288 bgcolor=#fefefe
| 149288 ||  || — || October 7, 2002 || Socorro || LINEAR || — || align=right | 1.3 km || 
|-id=289 bgcolor=#E9E9E9
| 149289 ||  || — || October 7, 2002 || Socorro || LINEAR || — || align=right | 1.3 km || 
|-id=290 bgcolor=#fefefe
| 149290 ||  || — || October 8, 2002 || Anderson Mesa || LONEOS || — || align=right | 1.8 km || 
|-id=291 bgcolor=#fefefe
| 149291 ||  || — || October 6, 2002 || Haleakala || NEAT || ERI || align=right | 2.4 km || 
|-id=292 bgcolor=#fefefe
| 149292 ||  || — || October 6, 2002 || Socorro || LINEAR || — || align=right | 1.5 km || 
|-id=293 bgcolor=#fefefe
| 149293 ||  || — || October 7, 2002 || Anderson Mesa || LONEOS || FLO || align=right | 1.9 km || 
|-id=294 bgcolor=#fefefe
| 149294 ||  || — || October 7, 2002 || Anderson Mesa || LONEOS || — || align=right | 1.4 km || 
|-id=295 bgcolor=#fefefe
| 149295 ||  || — || October 8, 2002 || Anderson Mesa || LONEOS || — || align=right | 1.1 km || 
|-id=296 bgcolor=#fefefe
| 149296 ||  || — || October 9, 2002 || Socorro || LINEAR || FLO || align=right | 1.0 km || 
|-id=297 bgcolor=#fefefe
| 149297 ||  || — || October 10, 2002 || Socorro || LINEAR || — || align=right | 1.2 km || 
|-id=298 bgcolor=#fefefe
| 149298 ||  || — || October 10, 2002 || Socorro || LINEAR || V || align=right | 1.2 km || 
|-id=299 bgcolor=#fefefe
| 149299 ||  || — || October 10, 2002 || Socorro || LINEAR || FLO || align=right | 1.3 km || 
|-id=300 bgcolor=#fefefe
| 149300 ||  || — || October 10, 2002 || Socorro || LINEAR || V || align=right | 1.2 km || 
|}

149301–149400 

|-bgcolor=#fefefe
| 149301 ||  || — || October 10, 2002 || Socorro || LINEAR || — || align=right | 1.4 km || 
|-id=302 bgcolor=#fefefe
| 149302 ||  || — || October 10, 2002 || Socorro || LINEAR || FLO || align=right | 1.1 km || 
|-id=303 bgcolor=#E9E9E9
| 149303 ||  || — || October 13, 2002 || Palomar || NEAT || EUN || align=right | 2.4 km || 
|-id=304 bgcolor=#fefefe
| 149304 ||  || — || October 11, 2002 || Socorro || LINEAR || — || align=right | 1.1 km || 
|-id=305 bgcolor=#E9E9E9
| 149305 ||  || — || October 9, 2002 || Palomar || NEAT || — || align=right | 1.8 km || 
|-id=306 bgcolor=#fefefe
| 149306 ||  || — || October 28, 2002 || Kitt Peak || Spacewatch || FLO || align=right | 1.4 km || 
|-id=307 bgcolor=#E9E9E9
| 149307 ||  || — || October 28, 2002 || Tenagra II || C. W. Juels, P. R. Holvorcem || — || align=right | 4.3 km || 
|-id=308 bgcolor=#fefefe
| 149308 ||  || — || October 26, 2002 || Haleakala || NEAT || — || align=right | 2.1 km || 
|-id=309 bgcolor=#E9E9E9
| 149309 ||  || — || October 28, 2002 || Socorro || LINEAR || HNS || align=right | 2.5 km || 
|-id=310 bgcolor=#fefefe
| 149310 ||  || — || October 30, 2002 || Haleakala || NEAT || V || align=right | 1.3 km || 
|-id=311 bgcolor=#fefefe
| 149311 ||  || — || October 30, 2002 || Haleakala || NEAT || — || align=right | 1.2 km || 
|-id=312 bgcolor=#fefefe
| 149312 ||  || — || October 30, 2002 || Haleakala || NEAT || — || align=right | 2.9 km || 
|-id=313 bgcolor=#fefefe
| 149313 ||  || — || October 30, 2002 || Kvistaberg || UDAS || — || align=right | 1.7 km || 
|-id=314 bgcolor=#E9E9E9
| 149314 ||  || — || October 31, 2002 || Kitt Peak || Spacewatch || HNS || align=right | 2.6 km || 
|-id=315 bgcolor=#fefefe
| 149315 ||  || — || October 30, 2002 || Palomar || NEAT || — || align=right | 1.5 km || 
|-id=316 bgcolor=#E9E9E9
| 149316 ||  || — || October 31, 2002 || Anderson Mesa || LONEOS || — || align=right | 2.4 km || 
|-id=317 bgcolor=#E9E9E9
| 149317 ||  || — || October 31, 2002 || Socorro || LINEAR || — || align=right | 3.9 km || 
|-id=318 bgcolor=#E9E9E9
| 149318 ||  || — || October 31, 2002 || Haleakala || NEAT || — || align=right | 4.2 km || 
|-id=319 bgcolor=#fefefe
| 149319 || 2002 VB || — || November 1, 2002 || Pla D'Arguines || Pla D'Arguines Obs. || — || align=right | 2.0 km || 
|-id=320 bgcolor=#fefefe
| 149320 ||  || — || November 4, 2002 || Palomar || NEAT || — || align=right | 1.6 km || 
|-id=321 bgcolor=#fefefe
| 149321 ||  || — || November 6, 2002 || Socorro || LINEAR || — || align=right | 1.3 km || 
|-id=322 bgcolor=#fefefe
| 149322 ||  || — || November 5, 2002 || Socorro || LINEAR || FLO || align=right | 1.0 km || 
|-id=323 bgcolor=#fefefe
| 149323 ||  || — || November 5, 2002 || Socorro || LINEAR || — || align=right | 1.1 km || 
|-id=324 bgcolor=#fefefe
| 149324 ||  || — || November 5, 2002 || Socorro || LINEAR || — || align=right | 1.3 km || 
|-id=325 bgcolor=#fefefe
| 149325 ||  || — || November 5, 2002 || Socorro || LINEAR || NYS || align=right | 1.2 km || 
|-id=326 bgcolor=#fefefe
| 149326 ||  || — || November 5, 2002 || Socorro || LINEAR || — || align=right | 1.8 km || 
|-id=327 bgcolor=#fefefe
| 149327 ||  || — || November 5, 2002 || Socorro || LINEAR || — || align=right | 1.4 km || 
|-id=328 bgcolor=#fefefe
| 149328 ||  || — || November 5, 2002 || Socorro || LINEAR || — || align=right | 1.3 km || 
|-id=329 bgcolor=#E9E9E9
| 149329 ||  || — || November 6, 2002 || Socorro || LINEAR || — || align=right | 1.5 km || 
|-id=330 bgcolor=#fefefe
| 149330 ||  || — || November 5, 2002 || Palomar || NEAT || — || align=right | 1.4 km || 
|-id=331 bgcolor=#fefefe
| 149331 ||  || — || November 5, 2002 || Anderson Mesa || LONEOS || — || align=right | 1.4 km || 
|-id=332 bgcolor=#fefefe
| 149332 ||  || — || November 5, 2002 || Socorro || LINEAR || — || align=right | 1.7 km || 
|-id=333 bgcolor=#fefefe
| 149333 ||  || — || November 6, 2002 || Socorro || LINEAR || V || align=right | 1.2 km || 
|-id=334 bgcolor=#fefefe
| 149334 ||  || — || November 7, 2002 || Socorro || LINEAR || — || align=right | 1.7 km || 
|-id=335 bgcolor=#fefefe
| 149335 ||  || — || November 7, 2002 || Anderson Mesa || LONEOS || — || align=right | 1.3 km || 
|-id=336 bgcolor=#fefefe
| 149336 ||  || — || November 7, 2002 || Socorro || LINEAR || NYS || align=right | 2.4 km || 
|-id=337 bgcolor=#fefefe
| 149337 ||  || — || November 7, 2002 || Socorro || LINEAR || — || align=right | 1.5 km || 
|-id=338 bgcolor=#fefefe
| 149338 ||  || — || November 7, 2002 || Socorro || LINEAR || NYS || align=right | 1.1 km || 
|-id=339 bgcolor=#fefefe
| 149339 ||  || — || November 7, 2002 || Socorro || LINEAR || — || align=right | 1.5 km || 
|-id=340 bgcolor=#fefefe
| 149340 ||  || — || November 8, 2002 || Socorro || LINEAR || — || align=right | 1.4 km || 
|-id=341 bgcolor=#fefefe
| 149341 ||  || — || November 11, 2002 || Anderson Mesa || LONEOS || FLO || align=right | 2.1 km || 
|-id=342 bgcolor=#fefefe
| 149342 ||  || — || November 11, 2002 || Anderson Mesa || LONEOS || — || align=right | 1.1 km || 
|-id=343 bgcolor=#fefefe
| 149343 ||  || — || November 11, 2002 || Socorro || LINEAR || V || align=right | 1.2 km || 
|-id=344 bgcolor=#fefefe
| 149344 ||  || — || November 12, 2002 || Socorro || LINEAR || NYS || align=right | 1.0 km || 
|-id=345 bgcolor=#fefefe
| 149345 ||  || — || November 12, 2002 || Palomar || NEAT || V || align=right | 1.1 km || 
|-id=346 bgcolor=#E9E9E9
| 149346 ||  || — || November 12, 2002 || Palomar || NEAT || — || align=right | 4.8 km || 
|-id=347 bgcolor=#fefefe
| 149347 ||  || — || November 14, 2002 || Socorro || LINEAR || — || align=right | 1.4 km || 
|-id=348 bgcolor=#C2E0FF
| 149348 ||  || — || November 7, 2002 || Kitt Peak || M. W. Buie || cubewano (cold)critical || align=right | 243 km || 
|-id=349 bgcolor=#C2E0FF
| 149349 ||  || — || November 9, 2002 || Kitt Peak || M. W. Buie || res3:5 || align=right | 222 km || 
|-id=350 bgcolor=#fefefe
| 149350 ||  || — || November 6, 2002 || Socorro || LINEAR || — || align=right | 2.4 km || 
|-id=351 bgcolor=#fefefe
| 149351 ||  || — || November 24, 2002 || Palomar || NEAT || NYS || align=right data-sort-value="0.97" | 970 m || 
|-id=352 bgcolor=#fefefe
| 149352 ||  || — || November 28, 2002 || Anderson Mesa || LONEOS || V || align=right data-sort-value="0.99" | 990 m || 
|-id=353 bgcolor=#fefefe
| 149353 ||  || — || December 1, 2002 || Socorro || LINEAR || MAS || align=right | 1.0 km || 
|-id=354 bgcolor=#fefefe
| 149354 ||  || — || December 2, 2002 || Socorro || LINEAR || FLO || align=right | 1.3 km || 
|-id=355 bgcolor=#fefefe
| 149355 ||  || — || December 5, 2002 || Socorro || LINEAR || NYS || align=right data-sort-value="0.92" | 920 m || 
|-id=356 bgcolor=#fefefe
| 149356 ||  || — || December 5, 2002 || Socorro || LINEAR || NYS || align=right data-sort-value="0.90" | 900 m || 
|-id=357 bgcolor=#fefefe
| 149357 ||  || — || December 5, 2002 || Socorro || LINEAR || — || align=right | 1.3 km || 
|-id=358 bgcolor=#fefefe
| 149358 ||  || — || December 5, 2002 || Socorro || LINEAR || — || align=right | 2.0 km || 
|-id=359 bgcolor=#fefefe
| 149359 ||  || — || December 5, 2002 || Socorro || LINEAR || FLO || align=right | 1.5 km || 
|-id=360 bgcolor=#E9E9E9
| 149360 ||  || — || December 5, 2002 || Socorro || LINEAR || — || align=right | 1.7 km || 
|-id=361 bgcolor=#fefefe
| 149361 ||  || — || December 5, 2002 || Socorro || LINEAR || V || align=right | 1.3 km || 
|-id=362 bgcolor=#fefefe
| 149362 ||  || — || December 6, 2002 || Socorro || LINEAR || V || align=right | 1.3 km || 
|-id=363 bgcolor=#fefefe
| 149363 ||  || — || December 8, 2002 || Haleakala || NEAT || V || align=right | 1.1 km || 
|-id=364 bgcolor=#fefefe
| 149364 ||  || — || December 10, 2002 || Socorro || LINEAR || — || align=right | 1.7 km || 
|-id=365 bgcolor=#fefefe
| 149365 ||  || — || December 10, 2002 || Socorro || LINEAR || NYS || align=right | 1.1 km || 
|-id=366 bgcolor=#fefefe
| 149366 ||  || — || December 10, 2002 || Socorro || LINEAR || MAS || align=right | 1.2 km || 
|-id=367 bgcolor=#fefefe
| 149367 ||  || — || December 10, 2002 || Palomar || NEAT || — || align=right | 1.4 km || 
|-id=368 bgcolor=#fefefe
| 149368 ||  || — || December 11, 2002 || Socorro || LINEAR || V || align=right | 1.2 km || 
|-id=369 bgcolor=#fefefe
| 149369 ||  || — || December 12, 2002 || Socorro || LINEAR || PHO || align=right | 4.0 km || 
|-id=370 bgcolor=#fefefe
| 149370 ||  || — || December 10, 2002 || Socorro || LINEAR || — || align=right | 1.3 km || 
|-id=371 bgcolor=#fefefe
| 149371 ||  || — || December 5, 2002 || Socorro || LINEAR || MAS || align=right | 1.4 km || 
|-id=372 bgcolor=#fefefe
| 149372 ||  || — || December 10, 2002 || Socorro || LINEAR || V || align=right | 1.9 km || 
|-id=373 bgcolor=#fefefe
| 149373 ||  || — || December 11, 2002 || Socorro || LINEAR || — || align=right | 1.5 km || 
|-id=374 bgcolor=#fefefe
| 149374 ||  || — || December 11, 2002 || Socorro || LINEAR || — || align=right | 5.7 km || 
|-id=375 bgcolor=#E9E9E9
| 149375 ||  || — || December 11, 2002 || Socorro || LINEAR || — || align=right | 4.2 km || 
|-id=376 bgcolor=#fefefe
| 149376 ||  || — || December 11, 2002 || Socorro || LINEAR || — || align=right | 1.6 km || 
|-id=377 bgcolor=#fefefe
| 149377 ||  || — || December 11, 2002 || Socorro || LINEAR || SUL || align=right | 3.1 km || 
|-id=378 bgcolor=#fefefe
| 149378 ||  || — || December 3, 2002 || Palomar || S. F. Hönig || V || align=right data-sort-value="0.99" | 990 m || 
|-id=379 bgcolor=#fefefe
| 149379 ||  || — || December 5, 2002 || Socorro || LINEAR || V || align=right | 1.0 km || 
|-id=380 bgcolor=#fefefe
| 149380 ||  || — || December 28, 2002 || Anderson Mesa || LONEOS || — || align=right | 3.1 km || 
|-id=381 bgcolor=#fefefe
| 149381 ||  || — || December 31, 2002 || Socorro || LINEAR || — || align=right | 1.3 km || 
|-id=382 bgcolor=#E9E9E9
| 149382 ||  || — || December 31, 2002 || Socorro || LINEAR || — || align=right | 1.7 km || 
|-id=383 bgcolor=#fefefe
| 149383 ||  || — || December 31, 2002 || Socorro || LINEAR || — || align=right | 1.9 km || 
|-id=384 bgcolor=#fefefe
| 149384 ||  || — || December 31, 2002 || Socorro || LINEAR || MAS || align=right | 1.2 km || 
|-id=385 bgcolor=#fefefe
| 149385 ||  || — || December 31, 2002 || Socorro || LINEAR || V || align=right | 1.4 km || 
|-id=386 bgcolor=#E9E9E9
| 149386 ||  || — || January 1, 2003 || Socorro || LINEAR || HNS || align=right | 2.0 km || 
|-id=387 bgcolor=#fefefe
| 149387 ||  || — || January 1, 2003 || Socorro || LINEAR || NYS || align=right | 1.4 km || 
|-id=388 bgcolor=#fefefe
| 149388 ||  || — || January 1, 2003 || Socorro || LINEAR || — || align=right | 1.7 km || 
|-id=389 bgcolor=#E9E9E9
| 149389 ||  || — || January 2, 2003 || Anderson Mesa || LONEOS || — || align=right | 3.6 km || 
|-id=390 bgcolor=#fefefe
| 149390 ||  || — || January 3, 2003 || Kitt Peak || Spacewatch || V || align=right | 1.2 km || 
|-id=391 bgcolor=#E9E9E9
| 149391 ||  || — || January 1, 2003 || Socorro || LINEAR || — || align=right | 2.2 km || 
|-id=392 bgcolor=#E9E9E9
| 149392 ||  || — || January 2, 2003 || Anderson Mesa || LONEOS || — || align=right | 2.0 km || 
|-id=393 bgcolor=#fefefe
| 149393 ||  || — || January 4, 2003 || Socorro || LINEAR || CIM || align=right | 3.2 km || 
|-id=394 bgcolor=#E9E9E9
| 149394 ||  || — || January 4, 2003 || Socorro || LINEAR || — || align=right | 1.7 km || 
|-id=395 bgcolor=#E9E9E9
| 149395 ||  || — || January 7, 2003 || Socorro || LINEAR || — || align=right | 2.6 km || 
|-id=396 bgcolor=#fefefe
| 149396 ||  || — || January 7, 2003 || Socorro || LINEAR || SUL || align=right | 3.2 km || 
|-id=397 bgcolor=#E9E9E9
| 149397 ||  || — || January 7, 2003 || Socorro || LINEAR || — || align=right | 4.3 km || 
|-id=398 bgcolor=#E9E9E9
| 149398 ||  || — || January 7, 2003 || Socorro || LINEAR || EUN || align=right | 2.1 km || 
|-id=399 bgcolor=#E9E9E9
| 149399 ||  || — || January 7, 2003 || Haleakala || NEAT || EUN || align=right | 3.2 km || 
|-id=400 bgcolor=#fefefe
| 149400 ||  || — || January 5, 2003 || Socorro || LINEAR || NYS || align=right | 1.3 km || 
|}

149401–149500 

|-bgcolor=#E9E9E9
| 149401 ||  || — || January 5, 2003 || Socorro || LINEAR || — || align=right | 2.0 km || 
|-id=402 bgcolor=#fefefe
| 149402 ||  || — || January 5, 2003 || Socorro || LINEAR || NYS || align=right | 1.3 km || 
|-id=403 bgcolor=#E9E9E9
| 149403 ||  || — || January 5, 2003 || Anderson Mesa || LONEOS || — || align=right | 4.0 km || 
|-id=404 bgcolor=#fefefe
| 149404 ||  || — || January 5, 2003 || Socorro || LINEAR || V || align=right | 1.5 km || 
|-id=405 bgcolor=#d6d6d6
| 149405 ||  || — || January 5, 2003 || Socorro || LINEAR || — || align=right | 5.1 km || 
|-id=406 bgcolor=#E9E9E9
| 149406 ||  || — || January 5, 2003 || Socorro || LINEAR || — || align=right | 1.6 km || 
|-id=407 bgcolor=#E9E9E9
| 149407 ||  || — || January 5, 2003 || Socorro || LINEAR || — || align=right | 4.9 km || 
|-id=408 bgcolor=#E9E9E9
| 149408 ||  || — || January 5, 2003 || Socorro || LINEAR || — || align=right | 2.4 km || 
|-id=409 bgcolor=#E9E9E9
| 149409 ||  || — || January 5, 2003 || Socorro || LINEAR || EUN || align=right | 3.2 km || 
|-id=410 bgcolor=#E9E9E9
| 149410 ||  || — || January 7, 2003 || Socorro || LINEAR || — || align=right | 1.7 km || 
|-id=411 bgcolor=#E9E9E9
| 149411 ||  || — || January 7, 2003 || Socorro || LINEAR || — || align=right | 2.9 km || 
|-id=412 bgcolor=#fefefe
| 149412 ||  || — || January 10, 2003 || Socorro || LINEAR || — || align=right | 4.1 km || 
|-id=413 bgcolor=#fefefe
| 149413 ||  || — || January 8, 2003 || Socorro || LINEAR || NYS || align=right | 1.4 km || 
|-id=414 bgcolor=#fefefe
| 149414 ||  || — || January 25, 2003 || Anderson Mesa || LONEOS || V || align=right | 1.3 km || 
|-id=415 bgcolor=#E9E9E9
| 149415 ||  || — || January 26, 2003 || Anderson Mesa || LONEOS || — || align=right | 1.7 km || 
|-id=416 bgcolor=#E9E9E9
| 149416 ||  || — || January 26, 2003 || Anderson Mesa || LONEOS || — || align=right | 2.3 km || 
|-id=417 bgcolor=#E9E9E9
| 149417 ||  || — || January 26, 2003 || Anderson Mesa || LONEOS || — || align=right | 1.8 km || 
|-id=418 bgcolor=#E9E9E9
| 149418 ||  || — || January 26, 2003 || Palomar || NEAT || — || align=right | 4.7 km || 
|-id=419 bgcolor=#fefefe
| 149419 ||  || — || January 27, 2003 || Socorro || LINEAR || MAS || align=right | 1.2 km || 
|-id=420 bgcolor=#E9E9E9
| 149420 ||  || — || January 27, 2003 || Socorro || LINEAR || — || align=right | 1.7 km || 
|-id=421 bgcolor=#E9E9E9
| 149421 ||  || — || January 27, 2003 || Palomar || NEAT || — || align=right | 1.7 km || 
|-id=422 bgcolor=#E9E9E9
| 149422 ||  || — || January 26, 2003 || Haleakala || NEAT || MRX || align=right | 1.7 km || 
|-id=423 bgcolor=#E9E9E9
| 149423 ||  || — || January 27, 2003 || Haleakala || NEAT || — || align=right | 1.9 km || 
|-id=424 bgcolor=#E9E9E9
| 149424 ||  || — || January 25, 2003 || Palomar || NEAT || — || align=right | 3.4 km || 
|-id=425 bgcolor=#E9E9E9
| 149425 ||  || — || January 26, 2003 || Anderson Mesa || LONEOS || — || align=right | 2.1 km || 
|-id=426 bgcolor=#E9E9E9
| 149426 ||  || — || January 27, 2003 || Socorro || LINEAR || MRX || align=right | 1.8 km || 
|-id=427 bgcolor=#E9E9E9
| 149427 ||  || — || January 27, 2003 || Socorro || LINEAR || — || align=right | 1.5 km || 
|-id=428 bgcolor=#d6d6d6
| 149428 ||  || — || January 29, 2003 || Palomar || NEAT || KOR || align=right | 2.2 km || 
|-id=429 bgcolor=#d6d6d6
| 149429 ||  || — || January 27, 2003 || Anderson Mesa || LONEOS || — || align=right | 4.1 km || 
|-id=430 bgcolor=#E9E9E9
| 149430 ||  || — || January 27, 2003 || Socorro || LINEAR || — || align=right | 1.9 km || 
|-id=431 bgcolor=#E9E9E9
| 149431 ||  || — || January 27, 2003 || Socorro || LINEAR || — || align=right | 2.7 km || 
|-id=432 bgcolor=#E9E9E9
| 149432 ||  || — || January 27, 2003 || Socorro || LINEAR || — || align=right | 2.4 km || 
|-id=433 bgcolor=#E9E9E9
| 149433 ||  || — || January 30, 2003 || Anderson Mesa || LONEOS || EUN || align=right | 2.4 km || 
|-id=434 bgcolor=#E9E9E9
| 149434 ||  || — || January 30, 2003 || Kitt Peak || Spacewatch || — || align=right | 3.1 km || 
|-id=435 bgcolor=#E9E9E9
| 149435 ||  || — || January 28, 2003 || Palomar || NEAT || JUN || align=right | 2.0 km || 
|-id=436 bgcolor=#E9E9E9
| 149436 ||  || — || January 29, 2003 || Palomar || NEAT || — || align=right | 1.9 km || 
|-id=437 bgcolor=#E9E9E9
| 149437 ||  || — || January 29, 2003 || Palomar || NEAT || BRU || align=right | 6.7 km || 
|-id=438 bgcolor=#E9E9E9
| 149438 ||  || — || January 30, 2003 || Anderson Mesa || LONEOS || MAR || align=right | 2.1 km || 
|-id=439 bgcolor=#E9E9E9
| 149439 ||  || — || January 31, 2003 || Socorro || LINEAR || MIT || align=right | 4.8 km || 
|-id=440 bgcolor=#E9E9E9
| 149440 ||  || — || January 30, 2003 || Anderson Mesa || LONEOS || MAR || align=right | 2.8 km || 
|-id=441 bgcolor=#E9E9E9
| 149441 ||  || — || January 26, 2003 || Anderson Mesa || LONEOS || — || align=right | 2.6 km || 
|-id=442 bgcolor=#E9E9E9
| 149442 ||  || — || January 28, 2003 || Kitt Peak || Spacewatch || — || align=right | 1.5 km || 
|-id=443 bgcolor=#E9E9E9
| 149443 ||  || — || January 28, 2003 || Socorro || LINEAR || EUN || align=right | 2.0 km || 
|-id=444 bgcolor=#fefefe
| 149444 ||  || — || February 2, 2003 || Socorro || LINEAR || — || align=right | 2.4 km || 
|-id=445 bgcolor=#E9E9E9
| 149445 ||  || — || February 1, 2003 || Socorro || LINEAR || — || align=right | 2.4 km || 
|-id=446 bgcolor=#E9E9E9
| 149446 ||  || — || February 1, 2003 || Socorro || LINEAR || — || align=right | 3.5 km || 
|-id=447 bgcolor=#E9E9E9
| 149447 ||  || — || February 1, 2003 || Socorro || LINEAR || — || align=right | 4.8 km || 
|-id=448 bgcolor=#E9E9E9
| 149448 ||  || — || February 2, 2003 || Socorro || LINEAR || — || align=right | 1.8 km || 
|-id=449 bgcolor=#E9E9E9
| 149449 ||  || — || February 2, 2003 || Haleakala || NEAT || — || align=right | 6.0 km || 
|-id=450 bgcolor=#E9E9E9
| 149450 ||  || — || February 6, 2003 || Wrightwood || J. W. Young || — || align=right | 1.5 km || 
|-id=451 bgcolor=#E9E9E9
| 149451 ||  || — || February 4, 2003 || Haleakala || NEAT || — || align=right | 2.9 km || 
|-id=452 bgcolor=#E9E9E9
| 149452 ||  || — || February 8, 2003 || Haleakala || NEAT || — || align=right | 3.2 km || 
|-id=453 bgcolor=#E9E9E9
| 149453 ||  || — || February 3, 2003 || Socorro || LINEAR || — || align=right | 1.2 km || 
|-id=454 bgcolor=#E9E9E9
| 149454 || 2003 DC || — || February 19, 2003 || Palomar || NEAT || BRU || align=right | 5.7 km || 
|-id=455 bgcolor=#E9E9E9
| 149455 ||  || — || February 25, 2003 || Campo Imperatore || CINEOS || — || align=right | 3.4 km || 
|-id=456 bgcolor=#E9E9E9
| 149456 ||  || — || February 26, 2003 || Campo Imperatore || CINEOS || AGN || align=right | 2.4 km || 
|-id=457 bgcolor=#E9E9E9
| 149457 ||  || — || February 25, 2003 || Haleakala || NEAT || — || align=right | 4.0 km || 
|-id=458 bgcolor=#E9E9E9
| 149458 ||  || — || February 26, 2003 || Haleakala || NEAT || — || align=right | 1.9 km || 
|-id=459 bgcolor=#E9E9E9
| 149459 ||  || — || February 22, 2003 || Palomar || NEAT || — || align=right | 3.2 km || 
|-id=460 bgcolor=#fefefe
| 149460 ||  || — || February 22, 2003 || Palomar || NEAT || NYS || align=right | 1.1 km || 
|-id=461 bgcolor=#E9E9E9
| 149461 ||  || — || February 23, 2003 || Anderson Mesa || LONEOS || EUN || align=right | 1.9 km || 
|-id=462 bgcolor=#E9E9E9
| 149462 ||  || — || February 22, 2003 || Palomar || NEAT || MAR || align=right | 1.6 km || 
|-id=463 bgcolor=#E9E9E9
| 149463 ||  || — || March 6, 2003 || Socorro || LINEAR || — || align=right | 3.8 km || 
|-id=464 bgcolor=#E9E9E9
| 149464 ||  || — || March 6, 2003 || Anderson Mesa || LONEOS || EUN || align=right | 2.4 km || 
|-id=465 bgcolor=#d6d6d6
| 149465 ||  || — || March 6, 2003 || Anderson Mesa || LONEOS || — || align=right | 5.1 km || 
|-id=466 bgcolor=#E9E9E9
| 149466 ||  || — || March 6, 2003 || Anderson Mesa || LONEOS || — || align=right | 1.8 km || 
|-id=467 bgcolor=#E9E9E9
| 149467 ||  || — || March 6, 2003 || Socorro || LINEAR || — || align=right | 2.9 km || 
|-id=468 bgcolor=#E9E9E9
| 149468 ||  || — || March 6, 2003 || Socorro || LINEAR || — || align=right | 2.0 km || 
|-id=469 bgcolor=#E9E9E9
| 149469 ||  || — || March 6, 2003 || Socorro || LINEAR || — || align=right | 2.3 km || 
|-id=470 bgcolor=#E9E9E9
| 149470 ||  || — || March 6, 2003 || Socorro || LINEAR || EUN || align=right | 1.7 km || 
|-id=471 bgcolor=#E9E9E9
| 149471 ||  || — || March 6, 2003 || Palomar || NEAT || — || align=right | 2.7 km || 
|-id=472 bgcolor=#E9E9E9
| 149472 ||  || — || March 6, 2003 || Palomar || NEAT || — || align=right | 2.0 km || 
|-id=473 bgcolor=#E9E9E9
| 149473 ||  || — || March 7, 2003 || Socorro || LINEAR || — || align=right | 3.3 km || 
|-id=474 bgcolor=#E9E9E9
| 149474 ||  || — || March 6, 2003 || Anderson Mesa || LONEOS || — || align=right | 3.9 km || 
|-id=475 bgcolor=#d6d6d6
| 149475 ||  || — || March 6, 2003 || Socorro || LINEAR || — || align=right | 4.6 km || 
|-id=476 bgcolor=#E9E9E9
| 149476 ||  || — || March 6, 2003 || Socorro || LINEAR || NEM || align=right | 4.3 km || 
|-id=477 bgcolor=#E9E9E9
| 149477 ||  || — || March 6, 2003 || Socorro || LINEAR || — || align=right | 3.4 km || 
|-id=478 bgcolor=#E9E9E9
| 149478 ||  || — || March 6, 2003 || Socorro || LINEAR || — || align=right | 2.6 km || 
|-id=479 bgcolor=#E9E9E9
| 149479 ||  || — || March 6, 2003 || Anderson Mesa || LONEOS || — || align=right | 2.1 km || 
|-id=480 bgcolor=#E9E9E9
| 149480 ||  || — || March 6, 2003 || Socorro || LINEAR || MRX || align=right | 1.8 km || 
|-id=481 bgcolor=#E9E9E9
| 149481 ||  || — || March 7, 2003 || Socorro || LINEAR || — || align=right | 2.3 km || 
|-id=482 bgcolor=#E9E9E9
| 149482 ||  || — || March 7, 2003 || Anderson Mesa || LONEOS || — || align=right | 4.1 km || 
|-id=483 bgcolor=#E9E9E9
| 149483 ||  || — || March 7, 2003 || Anderson Mesa || LONEOS || — || align=right | 2.4 km || 
|-id=484 bgcolor=#E9E9E9
| 149484 ||  || — || March 7, 2003 || Anderson Mesa || LONEOS || — || align=right | 2.2 km || 
|-id=485 bgcolor=#E9E9E9
| 149485 ||  || — || March 8, 2003 || Anderson Mesa || LONEOS || — || align=right | 4.9 km || 
|-id=486 bgcolor=#E9E9E9
| 149486 ||  || — || March 8, 2003 || Anderson Mesa || LONEOS || — || align=right | 2.8 km || 
|-id=487 bgcolor=#d6d6d6
| 149487 ||  || — || March 8, 2003 || Anderson Mesa || LONEOS || — || align=right | 5.1 km || 
|-id=488 bgcolor=#E9E9E9
| 149488 ||  || — || March 8, 2003 || Anderson Mesa || LONEOS || HNS || align=right | 2.1 km || 
|-id=489 bgcolor=#E9E9E9
| 149489 ||  || — || March 7, 2003 || Socorro || LINEAR || — || align=right | 3.3 km || 
|-id=490 bgcolor=#d6d6d6
| 149490 ||  || — || March 8, 2003 || Anderson Mesa || LONEOS || — || align=right | 5.2 km || 
|-id=491 bgcolor=#E9E9E9
| 149491 ||  || — || March 9, 2003 || Anderson Mesa || LONEOS || — || align=right | 2.3 km || 
|-id=492 bgcolor=#E9E9E9
| 149492 ||  || — || March 9, 2003 || Socorro || LINEAR || — || align=right | 3.1 km || 
|-id=493 bgcolor=#E9E9E9
| 149493 ||  || — || March 10, 2003 || Anderson Mesa || LONEOS || — || align=right | 4.1 km || 
|-id=494 bgcolor=#E9E9E9
| 149494 ||  || — || March 10, 2003 || Palomar || NEAT || HNS || align=right | 1.9 km || 
|-id=495 bgcolor=#E9E9E9
| 149495 ||  || — || March 9, 2003 || Palomar || NEAT || EUN || align=right | 4.5 km || 
|-id=496 bgcolor=#E9E9E9
| 149496 ||  || — || March 9, 2003 || Socorro || LINEAR || JUN || align=right | 1.8 km || 
|-id=497 bgcolor=#E9E9E9
| 149497 ||  || — || March 23, 2003 || Kitt Peak || Spacewatch || HOF || align=right | 4.3 km || 
|-id=498 bgcolor=#d6d6d6
| 149498 ||  || — || March 23, 2003 || Kitt Peak || Spacewatch || — || align=right | 3.8 km || 
|-id=499 bgcolor=#E9E9E9
| 149499 ||  || — || March 23, 2003 || Haleakala || NEAT || — || align=right | 4.2 km || 
|-id=500 bgcolor=#E9E9E9
| 149500 ||  || — || March 24, 2003 || Kitt Peak || Spacewatch || — || align=right | 3.8 km || 
|}

149501–149600 

|-bgcolor=#E9E9E9
| 149501 ||  || — || March 23, 2003 || Kitt Peak || Spacewatch || HEN || align=right | 1.6 km || 
|-id=502 bgcolor=#d6d6d6
| 149502 ||  || — || March 23, 2003 || Kitt Peak || Spacewatch || — || align=right | 3.4 km || 
|-id=503 bgcolor=#d6d6d6
| 149503 ||  || — || March 24, 2003 || Kitt Peak || Spacewatch || KOR || align=right | 1.9 km || 
|-id=504 bgcolor=#d6d6d6
| 149504 ||  || — || March 24, 2003 || Kitt Peak || Spacewatch || THM || align=right | 4.9 km || 
|-id=505 bgcolor=#E9E9E9
| 149505 ||  || — || March 24, 2003 || Haleakala || NEAT || — || align=right | 2.3 km || 
|-id=506 bgcolor=#E9E9E9
| 149506 ||  || — || March 26, 2003 || Palomar || NEAT || MIS || align=right | 4.2 km || 
|-id=507 bgcolor=#d6d6d6
| 149507 ||  || — || March 26, 2003 || Palomar || NEAT || — || align=right | 3.4 km || 
|-id=508 bgcolor=#E9E9E9
| 149508 ||  || — || March 26, 2003 || Kitt Peak || Spacewatch || — || align=right | 4.2 km || 
|-id=509 bgcolor=#E9E9E9
| 149509 ||  || — || March 26, 2003 || Palomar || NEAT || — || align=right | 3.3 km || 
|-id=510 bgcolor=#E9E9E9
| 149510 ||  || — || March 26, 2003 || Palomar || NEAT || — || align=right | 3.4 km || 
|-id=511 bgcolor=#E9E9E9
| 149511 ||  || — || March 26, 2003 || Palomar || NEAT || — || align=right | 3.2 km || 
|-id=512 bgcolor=#E9E9E9
| 149512 ||  || — || March 26, 2003 || Palomar || NEAT || PAD || align=right | 2.9 km || 
|-id=513 bgcolor=#E9E9E9
| 149513 ||  || — || March 26, 2003 || Kitt Peak || Spacewatch || AGN || align=right | 2.1 km || 
|-id=514 bgcolor=#E9E9E9
| 149514 ||  || — || March 26, 2003 || Kitt Peak || Spacewatch || MIS || align=right | 4.2 km || 
|-id=515 bgcolor=#E9E9E9
| 149515 ||  || — || March 26, 2003 || Haleakala || NEAT || — || align=right | 4.7 km || 
|-id=516 bgcolor=#d6d6d6
| 149516 ||  || — || March 26, 2003 || Palomar || NEAT || — || align=right | 5.1 km || 
|-id=517 bgcolor=#E9E9E9
| 149517 ||  || — || March 26, 2003 || Haleakala || NEAT || — || align=right | 4.8 km || 
|-id=518 bgcolor=#E9E9E9
| 149518 ||  || — || March 27, 2003 || Kitt Peak || Spacewatch || — || align=right | 2.5 km || 
|-id=519 bgcolor=#E9E9E9
| 149519 ||  || — || March 29, 2003 || Anderson Mesa || LONEOS || — || align=right | 5.2 km || 
|-id=520 bgcolor=#E9E9E9
| 149520 ||  || — || March 29, 2003 || Anderson Mesa || LONEOS || — || align=right | 1.7 km || 
|-id=521 bgcolor=#E9E9E9
| 149521 ||  || — || March 29, 2003 || Anderson Mesa || LONEOS || — || align=right | 5.0 km || 
|-id=522 bgcolor=#E9E9E9
| 149522 ||  || — || March 30, 2003 || Anderson Mesa || LONEOS || — || align=right | 3.8 km || 
|-id=523 bgcolor=#d6d6d6
| 149523 ||  || — || March 26, 2003 || Kitt Peak || Spacewatch || CHA || align=right | 4.1 km || 
|-id=524 bgcolor=#E9E9E9
| 149524 ||  || — || March 30, 2003 || Socorro || LINEAR || — || align=right | 3.0 km || 
|-id=525 bgcolor=#E9E9E9
| 149525 ||  || — || March 31, 2003 || Socorro || LINEAR || — || align=right | 2.3 km || 
|-id=526 bgcolor=#E9E9E9
| 149526 ||  || — || March 31, 2003 || Kitt Peak || Spacewatch || MRX || align=right | 1.4 km || 
|-id=527 bgcolor=#E9E9E9
| 149527 ||  || — || March 25, 2003 || Palomar || NEAT || — || align=right | 3.8 km || 
|-id=528 bgcolor=#d6d6d6
| 149528 Simónrodríguez ||  ||  || March 24, 2003 || Mérida || I. R. Ferrín, C. Leal || TIR || align=right | 4.4 km || 
|-id=529 bgcolor=#E9E9E9
| 149529 ||  || — || April 1, 2003 || Socorro || LINEAR || — || align=right | 1.9 km || 
|-id=530 bgcolor=#E9E9E9
| 149530 ||  || — || April 1, 2003 || Socorro || LINEAR || — || align=right | 4.3 km || 
|-id=531 bgcolor=#E9E9E9
| 149531 ||  || — || April 1, 2003 || Kitt Peak || Spacewatch || — || align=right | 3.8 km || 
|-id=532 bgcolor=#E9E9E9
| 149532 ||  || — || April 2, 2003 || Haleakala || NEAT || — || align=right | 2.9 km || 
|-id=533 bgcolor=#E9E9E9
| 149533 ||  || — || April 2, 2003 || Haleakala || NEAT || — || align=right | 3.3 km || 
|-id=534 bgcolor=#E9E9E9
| 149534 ||  || — || April 4, 2003 || Anderson Mesa || LONEOS || CLO || align=right | 2.9 km || 
|-id=535 bgcolor=#E9E9E9
| 149535 ||  || — || April 7, 2003 || Kitt Peak || Spacewatch || HEN || align=right | 1.9 km || 
|-id=536 bgcolor=#d6d6d6
| 149536 ||  || — || April 6, 2003 || Anderson Mesa || LONEOS || 7:4 || align=right | 7.5 km || 
|-id=537 bgcolor=#FA8072
| 149537 ||  || — || April 9, 2003 || Socorro || LINEAR || — || align=right | 4.8 km || 
|-id=538 bgcolor=#E9E9E9
| 149538 ||  || — || April 8, 2003 || Socorro || LINEAR || DOR || align=right | 3.7 km || 
|-id=539 bgcolor=#E9E9E9
| 149539 ||  || — || April 8, 2003 || Haleakala || NEAT || — || align=right | 3.6 km || 
|-id=540 bgcolor=#E9E9E9
| 149540 ||  || — || April 8, 2003 || Haleakala || NEAT || — || align=right | 4.1 km || 
|-id=541 bgcolor=#E9E9E9
| 149541 ||  || — || April 24, 2003 || Anderson Mesa || LONEOS || — || align=right | 3.6 km || 
|-id=542 bgcolor=#d6d6d6
| 149542 ||  || — || April 26, 2003 || Kitt Peak || Spacewatch || — || align=right | 4.0 km || 
|-id=543 bgcolor=#d6d6d6
| 149543 ||  || — || April 29, 2003 || Kitt Peak || Spacewatch || — || align=right | 4.2 km || 
|-id=544 bgcolor=#d6d6d6
| 149544 ||  || — || April 28, 2003 || Kitt Peak || Spacewatch || — || align=right | 9.1 km || 
|-id=545 bgcolor=#d6d6d6
| 149545 ||  || — || April 30, 2003 || Kitt Peak || Spacewatch || EOS || align=right | 3.3 km || 
|-id=546 bgcolor=#E9E9E9
| 149546 ||  || — || May 1, 2003 || Socorro || LINEAR || — || align=right | 3.5 km || 
|-id=547 bgcolor=#E9E9E9
| 149547 ||  || — || May 2, 2003 || Socorro || LINEAR || — || align=right | 3.7 km || 
|-id=548 bgcolor=#d6d6d6
| 149548 || 2003 KY || — || May 20, 2003 || Haleakala || NEAT || — || align=right | 7.3 km || 
|-id=549 bgcolor=#d6d6d6
| 149549 ||  || — || May 22, 2003 || Kitt Peak || Spacewatch || EOS || align=right | 2.8 km || 
|-id=550 bgcolor=#d6d6d6
| 149550 ||  || — || May 22, 2003 || Kitt Peak || Spacewatch || — || align=right | 4.7 km || 
|-id=551 bgcolor=#E9E9E9
| 149551 ||  || — || May 25, 2003 || Anderson Mesa || LONEOS || GEF || align=right | 2.1 km || 
|-id=552 bgcolor=#E9E9E9
| 149552 ||  || — || May 26, 2003 || Kitt Peak || Spacewatch || — || align=right | 2.6 km || 
|-id=553 bgcolor=#d6d6d6
| 149553 ||  || — || May 27, 2003 || Kitt Peak || Spacewatch || THM || align=right | 3.2 km || 
|-id=554 bgcolor=#d6d6d6
| 149554 ||  || — || May 22, 2003 || Kitt Peak || Spacewatch || — || align=right | 4.0 km || 
|-id=555 bgcolor=#d6d6d6
| 149555 ||  || — || May 26, 2003 || Kitt Peak || Spacewatch || — || align=right | 4.0 km || 
|-id=556 bgcolor=#d6d6d6
| 149556 ||  || — || June 2, 2003 || Kitt Peak || Spacewatch || — || align=right | 3.1 km || 
|-id=557 bgcolor=#E9E9E9
| 149557 ||  || — || June 4, 2003 || Reedy Creek || J. Broughton || — || align=right | 3.1 km || 
|-id=558 bgcolor=#d6d6d6
| 149558 ||  || — || July 1, 2003 || Socorro || LINEAR || EOS || align=right | 4.0 km || 
|-id=559 bgcolor=#d6d6d6
| 149559 ||  || — || July 22, 2003 || Campo Imperatore || CINEOS || TIR || align=right | 6.7 km || 
|-id=560 bgcolor=#C2E0FF
| 149560 ||  || — || August 24, 2003 || Cerro Tololo || M. W. Buie || centaurcritical || align=right | 106 km || 
|-id=561 bgcolor=#fefefe
| 149561 ||  || — || September 28, 2003 || Socorro || LINEAR || H || align=right | 1.1 km || 
|-id=562 bgcolor=#fefefe
| 149562 ||  || — || October 21, 2003 || Kitt Peak || Spacewatch || H || align=right data-sort-value="0.85" | 850 m || 
|-id=563 bgcolor=#fefefe
| 149563 ||  || — || November 15, 2003 || Kitt Peak || Spacewatch || H || align=right | 1.4 km || 
|-id=564 bgcolor=#fefefe
| 149564 ||  || — || November 18, 2003 || Socorro || LINEAR || H || align=right | 1.1 km || 
|-id=565 bgcolor=#fefefe
| 149565 ||  || — || November 18, 2003 || Kitt Peak || Spacewatch || — || align=right data-sort-value="0.90" | 900 m || 
|-id=566 bgcolor=#fefefe
| 149566 ||  || — || November 20, 2003 || Socorro || LINEAR || V || align=right data-sort-value="0.95" | 950 m || 
|-id=567 bgcolor=#fefefe
| 149567 ||  || — || December 11, 2003 || Socorro || LINEAR || H || align=right | 1.1 km || 
|-id=568 bgcolor=#fefefe
| 149568 ||  || — || December 16, 2003 || Kitt Peak || Spacewatch || FLO || align=right | 1.0 km || 
|-id=569 bgcolor=#fefefe
| 149569 ||  || — || December 17, 2003 || Kitt Peak || Spacewatch || — || align=right | 1.6 km || 
|-id=570 bgcolor=#fefefe
| 149570 ||  || — || December 18, 2003 || Socorro || LINEAR || V || align=right | 1.3 km || 
|-id=571 bgcolor=#E9E9E9
| 149571 ||  || — || December 18, 2003 || Palomar || NEAT || — || align=right | 3.4 km || 
|-id=572 bgcolor=#fefefe
| 149572 ||  || — || December 21, 2003 || Socorro || LINEAR || — || align=right | 1.3 km || 
|-id=573 bgcolor=#fefefe
| 149573 Mamorudoi ||  ||  || December 21, 2003 || Apache Point || SDSS || — || align=right | 1.2 km || 
|-id=574 bgcolor=#E9E9E9
| 149574 ||  || — || January 18, 2004 || Palomar || NEAT || — || align=right | 2.0 km || 
|-id=575 bgcolor=#fefefe
| 149575 ||  || — || January 19, 2004 || Kitt Peak || Spacewatch || — || align=right | 2.0 km || 
|-id=576 bgcolor=#fefefe
| 149576 ||  || — || January 22, 2004 || Palomar || NEAT || — || align=right | 1.3 km || 
|-id=577 bgcolor=#fefefe
| 149577 ||  || — || January 22, 2004 || Socorro || LINEAR || V || align=right | 1.4 km || 
|-id=578 bgcolor=#fefefe
| 149578 ||  || — || January 23, 2004 || Anderson Mesa || LONEOS || NYS || align=right | 1.1 km || 
|-id=579 bgcolor=#E9E9E9
| 149579 ||  || — || January 23, 2004 || Socorro || LINEAR || — || align=right | 2.6 km || 
|-id=580 bgcolor=#fefefe
| 149580 ||  || — || January 26, 2004 || Anderson Mesa || LONEOS || — || align=right | 1.1 km || 
|-id=581 bgcolor=#fefefe
| 149581 ||  || — || January 27, 2004 || Kitt Peak || Spacewatch || — || align=right | 1.3 km || 
|-id=582 bgcolor=#fefefe
| 149582 ||  || — || January 24, 2004 || Socorro || LINEAR || NYS || align=right data-sort-value="0.84" | 840 m || 
|-id=583 bgcolor=#fefefe
| 149583 ||  || — || January 24, 2004 || Socorro || LINEAR || NYS || align=right data-sort-value="0.96" | 960 m || 
|-id=584 bgcolor=#E9E9E9
| 149584 ||  || — || January 28, 2004 || Catalina || CSS || — || align=right | 1.4 km || 
|-id=585 bgcolor=#fefefe
| 149585 ||  || — || January 24, 2004 || Socorro || LINEAR || — || align=right | 1.2 km || 
|-id=586 bgcolor=#fefefe
| 149586 ||  || — || February 10, 2004 || Catalina || CSS || V || align=right data-sort-value="0.93" | 930 m || 
|-id=587 bgcolor=#E9E9E9
| 149587 ||  || — || February 11, 2004 || Kitt Peak || Spacewatch || EUN || align=right | 1.9 km || 
|-id=588 bgcolor=#E9E9E9
| 149588 ||  || — || February 12, 2004 || Kitt Peak || Spacewatch || — || align=right | 1.5 km || 
|-id=589 bgcolor=#fefefe
| 149589 ||  || — || February 11, 2004 || Kitt Peak || Spacewatch || — || align=right | 1.2 km || 
|-id=590 bgcolor=#fefefe
| 149590 ||  || — || February 12, 2004 || Desert Eagle || W. K. Y. Yeung || FLO || align=right | 1.2 km || 
|-id=591 bgcolor=#fefefe
| 149591 ||  || — || February 13, 2004 || Desert Eagle || W. K. Y. Yeung || V || align=right | 1.2 km || 
|-id=592 bgcolor=#FA8072
| 149592 ||  || — || February 11, 2004 || Palomar || NEAT || — || align=right | 1.8 km || 
|-id=593 bgcolor=#fefefe
| 149593 ||  || — || February 11, 2004 || Palomar || NEAT || — || align=right | 1.3 km || 
|-id=594 bgcolor=#E9E9E9
| 149594 ||  || — || February 11, 2004 || Palomar || NEAT || — || align=right | 2.8 km || 
|-id=595 bgcolor=#fefefe
| 149595 ||  || — || February 14, 2004 || Kitt Peak || Spacewatch || NYS || align=right | 1.3 km || 
|-id=596 bgcolor=#E9E9E9
| 149596 ||  || — || February 14, 2004 || Kitt Peak || Spacewatch || — || align=right | 3.0 km || 
|-id=597 bgcolor=#fefefe
| 149597 ||  || — || February 12, 2004 || Palomar || NEAT || — || align=right | 1.4 km || 
|-id=598 bgcolor=#fefefe
| 149598 ||  || — || February 13, 2004 || Kitt Peak || Spacewatch || — || align=right | 1.0 km || 
|-id=599 bgcolor=#fefefe
| 149599 ||  || — || February 14, 2004 || Kitt Peak || Spacewatch || — || align=right | 2.5 km || 
|-id=600 bgcolor=#fefefe
| 149600 ||  || — || February 17, 2004 || Haleakala || NEAT || — || align=right | 1.5 km || 
|}

149601–149700 

|-bgcolor=#fefefe
| 149601 ||  || — || February 16, 2004 || Catalina || CSS || — || align=right | 1.7 km || 
|-id=602 bgcolor=#fefefe
| 149602 ||  || — || February 17, 2004 || Socorro || LINEAR || — || align=right | 1.9 km || 
|-id=603 bgcolor=#fefefe
| 149603 ||  || — || February 17, 2004 || Kitt Peak || Spacewatch || V || align=right | 1.3 km || 
|-id=604 bgcolor=#E9E9E9
| 149604 ||  || — || February 17, 2004 || Catalina || CSS || — || align=right | 2.8 km || 
|-id=605 bgcolor=#fefefe
| 149605 ||  || — || February 18, 2004 || Catalina || CSS || — || align=right | 1.4 km || 
|-id=606 bgcolor=#E9E9E9
| 149606 ||  || — || February 17, 2004 || Kitt Peak || Spacewatch || INO || align=right | 1.8 km || 
|-id=607 bgcolor=#E9E9E9
| 149607 ||  || — || February 19, 2004 || Haleakala || NEAT || — || align=right | 2.8 km || 
|-id=608 bgcolor=#E9E9E9
| 149608 ||  || — || February 25, 2004 || Goodricke-Pigott || Goodricke-Pigott Obs. || JUN || align=right | 2.6 km || 
|-id=609 bgcolor=#fefefe
| 149609 ||  || — || February 19, 2004 || Socorro || LINEAR || — || align=right | 1.9 km || 
|-id=610 bgcolor=#fefefe
| 149610 ||  || — || February 26, 2004 || Socorro || LINEAR || NYS || align=right | 1.1 km || 
|-id=611 bgcolor=#fefefe
| 149611 ||  || — || February 29, 2004 || Kitt Peak || Spacewatch || — || align=right | 1.0 km || 
|-id=612 bgcolor=#fefefe
| 149612 ||  || — || March 12, 2004 || Palomar || NEAT || NYSslow || align=right | 1.4 km || 
|-id=613 bgcolor=#d6d6d6
| 149613 ||  || — || March 13, 2004 || Palomar || NEAT || — || align=right | 3.7 km || 
|-id=614 bgcolor=#fefefe
| 149614 ||  || — || March 10, 2004 || Palomar || NEAT || FLO || align=right | 2.0 km || 
|-id=615 bgcolor=#fefefe
| 149615 ||  || — || March 11, 2004 || Palomar || NEAT || — || align=right | 1.2 km || 
|-id=616 bgcolor=#E9E9E9
| 149616 ||  || — || March 11, 2004 || Palomar || NEAT || — || align=right | 1.4 km || 
|-id=617 bgcolor=#fefefe
| 149617 ||  || — || March 12, 2004 || Palomar || NEAT || FLO || align=right | 1.1 km || 
|-id=618 bgcolor=#fefefe
| 149618 ||  || — || March 15, 2004 || Socorro || LINEAR || FLO || align=right data-sort-value="0.98" | 980 m || 
|-id=619 bgcolor=#fefefe
| 149619 ||  || — || March 15, 2004 || Desert Eagle || W. K. Y. Yeung || FLO || align=right | 1.1 km || 
|-id=620 bgcolor=#fefefe
| 149620 ||  || — || March 15, 2004 || Kitt Peak || Spacewatch || — || align=right data-sort-value="0.94" | 940 m || 
|-id=621 bgcolor=#fefefe
| 149621 ||  || — || March 15, 2004 || Catalina || CSS || FLO || align=right data-sort-value="0.92" | 920 m || 
|-id=622 bgcolor=#fefefe
| 149622 ||  || — || March 15, 2004 || Socorro || LINEAR || — || align=right | 1.2 km || 
|-id=623 bgcolor=#fefefe
| 149623 ||  || — || March 13, 2004 || Palomar || NEAT || — || align=right | 1.3 km || 
|-id=624 bgcolor=#fefefe
| 149624 ||  || — || March 13, 2004 || Palomar || NEAT || — || align=right | 1.4 km || 
|-id=625 bgcolor=#fefefe
| 149625 ||  || — || March 15, 2004 || Kitt Peak || Spacewatch || NYS || align=right | 1.1 km || 
|-id=626 bgcolor=#d6d6d6
| 149626 ||  || — || March 15, 2004 || Catalina || CSS || — || align=right | 3.6 km || 
|-id=627 bgcolor=#E9E9E9
| 149627 ||  || — || March 15, 2004 || Socorro || LINEAR || HNS || align=right | 2.0 km || 
|-id=628 bgcolor=#fefefe
| 149628 ||  || — || March 14, 2004 || Palomar || NEAT || FLO || align=right | 1.1 km || 
|-id=629 bgcolor=#fefefe
| 149629 ||  || — || March 14, 2004 || Palomar || NEAT || — || align=right | 1.3 km || 
|-id=630 bgcolor=#fefefe
| 149630 ||  || — || March 15, 2004 || Palomar || NEAT || — || align=right | 1.7 km || 
|-id=631 bgcolor=#fefefe
| 149631 ||  || — || March 11, 2004 || Palomar || NEAT || — || align=right | 1.0 km || 
|-id=632 bgcolor=#fefefe
| 149632 ||  || — || March 12, 2004 || Palomar || NEAT || — || align=right | 1.4 km || 
|-id=633 bgcolor=#fefefe
| 149633 ||  || — || March 14, 2004 || Kitt Peak || Spacewatch || — || align=right | 1.3 km || 
|-id=634 bgcolor=#fefefe
| 149634 ||  || — || March 15, 2004 || Socorro || LINEAR || — || align=right | 1.1 km || 
|-id=635 bgcolor=#E9E9E9
| 149635 ||  || — || March 15, 2004 || Catalina || CSS || — || align=right | 1.5 km || 
|-id=636 bgcolor=#E9E9E9
| 149636 ||  || — || March 15, 2004 || Catalina || CSS || — || align=right | 2.4 km || 
|-id=637 bgcolor=#fefefe
| 149637 ||  || — || March 15, 2004 || Catalina || CSS || FLO || align=right | 1.1 km || 
|-id=638 bgcolor=#fefefe
| 149638 ||  || — || March 12, 2004 || Palomar || NEAT || — || align=right | 1.6 km || 
|-id=639 bgcolor=#FA8072
| 149639 ||  || — || March 18, 2004 || Socorro || LINEAR || — || align=right | 1.4 km || 
|-id=640 bgcolor=#fefefe
| 149640 ||  || — || March 16, 2004 || Campo Imperatore || CINEOS || FLO || align=right | 1.6 km || 
|-id=641 bgcolor=#fefefe
| 149641 ||  || — || March 16, 2004 || Kitt Peak || Spacewatch || — || align=right | 1.2 km || 
|-id=642 bgcolor=#fefefe
| 149642 ||  || — || March 16, 2004 || Socorro || LINEAR || FLO || align=right | 1.2 km || 
|-id=643 bgcolor=#d6d6d6
| 149643 ||  || — || March 17, 2004 || Kitt Peak || Spacewatch || THM || align=right | 3.0 km || 
|-id=644 bgcolor=#d6d6d6
| 149644 ||  || — || March 17, 2004 || Kitt Peak || Spacewatch || THM || align=right | 5.1 km || 
|-id=645 bgcolor=#fefefe
| 149645 ||  || — || March 27, 2004 || Socorro || LINEAR || — || align=right | 2.2 km || 
|-id=646 bgcolor=#fefefe
| 149646 ||  || — || March 16, 2004 || Kitt Peak || Spacewatch || V || align=right | 1.00 km || 
|-id=647 bgcolor=#fefefe
| 149647 ||  || — || March 17, 2004 || Catalina || CSS || FLO || align=right | 1.1 km || 
|-id=648 bgcolor=#fefefe
| 149648 ||  || — || March 17, 2004 || Socorro || LINEAR || V || align=right | 1.3 km || 
|-id=649 bgcolor=#fefefe
| 149649 ||  || — || March 19, 2004 || Socorro || LINEAR || fast? || align=right | 1.5 km || 
|-id=650 bgcolor=#fefefe
| 149650 ||  || — || March 16, 2004 || Socorro || LINEAR || — || align=right | 1.2 km || 
|-id=651 bgcolor=#fefefe
| 149651 ||  || — || March 19, 2004 || Socorro || LINEAR || — || align=right | 1.3 km || 
|-id=652 bgcolor=#fefefe
| 149652 ||  || — || March 17, 2004 || Kitt Peak || Spacewatch || NYS || align=right data-sort-value="0.94" | 940 m || 
|-id=653 bgcolor=#fefefe
| 149653 ||  || — || March 16, 2004 || Socorro || LINEAR || V || align=right | 1.2 km || 
|-id=654 bgcolor=#fefefe
| 149654 ||  || — || March 18, 2004 || Socorro || LINEAR || NYS || align=right | 1.1 km || 
|-id=655 bgcolor=#fefefe
| 149655 ||  || — || March 19, 2004 || Socorro || LINEAR || — || align=right | 1.2 km || 
|-id=656 bgcolor=#fefefe
| 149656 ||  || — || March 19, 2004 || Socorro || LINEAR || NYS || align=right data-sort-value="0.94" | 940 m || 
|-id=657 bgcolor=#fefefe
| 149657 ||  || — || March 19, 2004 || Palomar || NEAT || FLO || align=right data-sort-value="0.69" | 690 m || 
|-id=658 bgcolor=#fefefe
| 149658 ||  || — || March 22, 2004 || Socorro || LINEAR || FLO || align=right data-sort-value="0.84" | 840 m || 
|-id=659 bgcolor=#fefefe
| 149659 ||  || — || March 18, 2004 || Socorro || LINEAR || MAS || align=right | 1.1 km || 
|-id=660 bgcolor=#fefefe
| 149660 ||  || — || March 19, 2004 || Socorro || LINEAR || V || align=right data-sort-value="0.99" | 990 m || 
|-id=661 bgcolor=#fefefe
| 149661 ||  || — || March 23, 2004 || Socorro || LINEAR || — || align=right | 1.3 km || 
|-id=662 bgcolor=#E9E9E9
| 149662 ||  || — || March 25, 2004 || Socorro || LINEAR || ADE || align=right | 3.5 km || 
|-id=663 bgcolor=#fefefe
| 149663 ||  || — || March 20, 2004 || Socorro || LINEAR || — || align=right | 1.5 km || 
|-id=664 bgcolor=#fefefe
| 149664 ||  || — || March 23, 2004 || Kitt Peak || Spacewatch || — || align=right | 1.8 km || 
|-id=665 bgcolor=#fefefe
| 149665 ||  || — || March 25, 2004 || Anderson Mesa || LONEOS || NYS || align=right | 2.8 km || 
|-id=666 bgcolor=#fefefe
| 149666 ||  || — || March 27, 2004 || Socorro || LINEAR || V || align=right | 1.3 km || 
|-id=667 bgcolor=#E9E9E9
| 149667 ||  || — || March 22, 2004 || Anderson Mesa || LONEOS || EUN || align=right | 1.9 km || 
|-id=668 bgcolor=#d6d6d6
| 149668 ||  || — || March 28, 2004 || Socorro || LINEAR || — || align=right | 4.3 km || 
|-id=669 bgcolor=#d6d6d6
| 149669 ||  || — || March 27, 2004 || Socorro || LINEAR || THM || align=right | 3.3 km || 
|-id=670 bgcolor=#fefefe
| 149670 ||  || — || March 27, 2004 || Socorro || LINEAR || — || align=right | 1.3 km || 
|-id=671 bgcolor=#fefefe
| 149671 ||  || — || March 27, 2004 || Anderson Mesa || LONEOS || FLO || align=right | 1.2 km || 
|-id=672 bgcolor=#fefefe
| 149672 ||  || — || March 30, 2004 || Kitt Peak || Spacewatch || — || align=right | 1.3 km || 
|-id=673 bgcolor=#fefefe
| 149673 ||  || — || April 12, 2004 || Anderson Mesa || LONEOS || NYS || align=right | 1.0 km || 
|-id=674 bgcolor=#E9E9E9
| 149674 ||  || — || April 11, 2004 || Catalina || CSS || BAR || align=right | 2.6 km || 
|-id=675 bgcolor=#fefefe
| 149675 ||  || — || April 11, 2004 || Palomar || NEAT || V || align=right | 1.0 km || 
|-id=676 bgcolor=#d6d6d6
| 149676 ||  || — || April 12, 2004 || Anderson Mesa || LONEOS || — || align=right | 5.0 km || 
|-id=677 bgcolor=#fefefe
| 149677 ||  || — || April 14, 2004 || Socorro || LINEAR || PHO || align=right | 1.7 km || 
|-id=678 bgcolor=#d6d6d6
| 149678 ||  || — || April 12, 2004 || Catalina || CSS || — || align=right | 5.1 km || 
|-id=679 bgcolor=#E9E9E9
| 149679 ||  || — || April 12, 2004 || Catalina || CSS || — || align=right | 4.2 km || 
|-id=680 bgcolor=#d6d6d6
| 149680 ||  || — || April 11, 2004 || Palomar || NEAT || LUT || align=right | 5.5 km || 
|-id=681 bgcolor=#E9E9E9
| 149681 ||  || — || April 13, 2004 || Kitt Peak || Spacewatch || — || align=right | 5.2 km || 
|-id=682 bgcolor=#E9E9E9
| 149682 ||  || — || April 11, 2004 || Catalina || CSS || — || align=right | 1.8 km || 
|-id=683 bgcolor=#E9E9E9
| 149683 ||  || — || April 12, 2004 || Kitt Peak || Spacewatch || — || align=right | 1.3 km || 
|-id=684 bgcolor=#E9E9E9
| 149684 ||  || — || April 12, 2004 || Palomar || NEAT || — || align=right | 2.1 km || 
|-id=685 bgcolor=#E9E9E9
| 149685 ||  || — || April 13, 2004 || Palomar || NEAT || — || align=right | 5.4 km || 
|-id=686 bgcolor=#fefefe
| 149686 ||  || — || April 13, 2004 || Palomar || NEAT || V || align=right | 1.3 km || 
|-id=687 bgcolor=#fefefe
| 149687 ||  || — || April 13, 2004 || Kitt Peak || Spacewatch || — || align=right | 1.3 km || 
|-id=688 bgcolor=#fefefe
| 149688 ||  || — || April 14, 2004 || Kitt Peak || Spacewatch || V || align=right | 1.1 km || 
|-id=689 bgcolor=#d6d6d6
| 149689 ||  || — || April 14, 2004 || Kitt Peak || Spacewatch || HYG || align=right | 5.6 km || 
|-id=690 bgcolor=#fefefe
| 149690 ||  || — || April 14, 2004 || Palomar || NEAT || — || align=right | 1.3 km || 
|-id=691 bgcolor=#fefefe
| 149691 || 2004 HN || — || April 18, 2004 || Pla D'Arguines || R. Ferrando || — || align=right | 1.0 km || 
|-id=692 bgcolor=#E9E9E9
| 149692 ||  || — || April 16, 2004 || Socorro || LINEAR || — || align=right | 3.2 km || 
|-id=693 bgcolor=#fefefe
| 149693 ||  || — || April 17, 2004 || Anderson Mesa || LONEOS || — || align=right | 1.4 km || 
|-id=694 bgcolor=#fefefe
| 149694 ||  || — || April 16, 2004 || Socorro || LINEAR || — || align=right | 1.6 km || 
|-id=695 bgcolor=#d6d6d6
| 149695 ||  || — || April 16, 2004 || Kitt Peak || Spacewatch || — || align=right | 5.5 km || 
|-id=696 bgcolor=#d6d6d6
| 149696 ||  || — || April 19, 2004 || Kitt Peak || Spacewatch || — || align=right | 7.2 km || 
|-id=697 bgcolor=#fefefe
| 149697 ||  || — || April 19, 2004 || Socorro || LINEAR || NYS || align=right | 1.0 km || 
|-id=698 bgcolor=#fefefe
| 149698 ||  || — || April 23, 2004 || Socorro || LINEAR || — || align=right | 1.6 km || 
|-id=699 bgcolor=#fefefe
| 149699 ||  || — || April 20, 2004 || Kitt Peak || Spacewatch || NYS || align=right data-sort-value="0.81" | 810 m || 
|-id=700 bgcolor=#fefefe
| 149700 ||  || — || April 20, 2004 || Socorro || LINEAR || — || align=right data-sort-value="0.99" | 990 m || 
|}

149701–149800 

|-bgcolor=#fefefe
| 149701 ||  || — || April 20, 2004 || Socorro || LINEAR || V || align=right | 1.1 km || 
|-id=702 bgcolor=#fefefe
| 149702 ||  || — || April 23, 2004 || Socorro || LINEAR || V || align=right | 1.2 km || 
|-id=703 bgcolor=#fefefe
| 149703 ||  || — || April 24, 2004 || Kitt Peak || Spacewatch || — || align=right | 1.2 km || 
|-id=704 bgcolor=#E9E9E9
| 149704 ||  || — || April 25, 2004 || Haleakala || NEAT || — || align=right | 4.7 km || 
|-id=705 bgcolor=#E9E9E9
| 149705 ||  || — || April 24, 2004 || Siding Spring || SSS || MAR || align=right | 1.8 km || 
|-id=706 bgcolor=#E9E9E9
| 149706 ||  || — || April 27, 2004 || Socorro || LINEAR || GER || align=right | 2.4 km || 
|-id=707 bgcolor=#d6d6d6
| 149707 ||  || — || April 30, 2004 || Kitt Peak || Spacewatch || — || align=right | 5.4 km || 
|-id=708 bgcolor=#d6d6d6
| 149708 ||  || — || April 16, 2004 || Palomar || NEAT || — || align=right | 5.6 km || 
|-id=709 bgcolor=#fefefe
| 149709 ||  || — || May 9, 2004 || Palomar || NEAT || — || align=right | 1.3 km || 
|-id=710 bgcolor=#d6d6d6
| 149710 ||  || — || May 11, 2004 || Anderson Mesa || LONEOS || — || align=right | 7.0 km || 
|-id=711 bgcolor=#fefefe
| 149711 ||  || — || May 10, 2004 || Catalina || CSS || — || align=right | 2.3 km || 
|-id=712 bgcolor=#E9E9E9
| 149712 ||  || — || May 10, 2004 || Palomar || NEAT || — || align=right | 4.9 km || 
|-id=713 bgcolor=#E9E9E9
| 149713 ||  || — || May 10, 2004 || Palomar || NEAT || MAR || align=right | 2.0 km || 
|-id=714 bgcolor=#fefefe
| 149714 ||  || — || May 9, 2004 || Haleakala || NEAT || V || align=right | 1.1 km || 
|-id=715 bgcolor=#E9E9E9
| 149715 ||  || — || May 10, 2004 || Catalina || CSS || — || align=right | 1.6 km || 
|-id=716 bgcolor=#fefefe
| 149716 ||  || — || May 13, 2004 || Kitt Peak || Spacewatch || — || align=right | 1.1 km || 
|-id=717 bgcolor=#fefefe
| 149717 ||  || — || May 13, 2004 || Palomar || NEAT || MAS || align=right data-sort-value="0.95" | 950 m || 
|-id=718 bgcolor=#fefefe
| 149718 ||  || — || May 14, 2004 || Catalina || CSS || — || align=right | 1.1 km || 
|-id=719 bgcolor=#fefefe
| 149719 ||  || — || May 10, 2004 || Palomar || NEAT || — || align=right | 1.4 km || 
|-id=720 bgcolor=#E9E9E9
| 149720 ||  || — || May 15, 2004 || Socorro || LINEAR || — || align=right | 1.6 km || 
|-id=721 bgcolor=#fefefe
| 149721 ||  || — || May 15, 2004 || Socorro || LINEAR || — || align=right | 1.4 km || 
|-id=722 bgcolor=#fefefe
| 149722 ||  || — || May 15, 2004 || Socorro || LINEAR || — || align=right | 1.6 km || 
|-id=723 bgcolor=#E9E9E9
| 149723 ||  || — || May 15, 2004 || Socorro || LINEAR || — || align=right | 1.5 km || 
|-id=724 bgcolor=#fefefe
| 149724 ||  || — || May 14, 2004 || Campo Imperatore || CINEOS || — || align=right | 1.2 km || 
|-id=725 bgcolor=#fefefe
| 149725 ||  || — || May 15, 2004 || Socorro || LINEAR || V || align=right | 1.2 km || 
|-id=726 bgcolor=#d6d6d6
| 149726 ||  || — || May 15, 2004 || Socorro || LINEAR || — || align=right | 4.7 km || 
|-id=727 bgcolor=#fefefe
| 149727 ||  || — || May 9, 2004 || Kitt Peak || Spacewatch || FLO || align=right data-sort-value="0.98" | 980 m || 
|-id=728 bgcolor=#E9E9E9
| 149728 Klostermann ||  ||  || May 19, 2004 || Kleť || KLENOT || — || align=right | 2.2 km || 
|-id=729 bgcolor=#d6d6d6
| 149729 ||  || — || May 16, 2004 || Socorro || LINEAR || — || align=right | 3.5 km || 
|-id=730 bgcolor=#E9E9E9
| 149730 ||  || — || May 16, 2004 || Reedy Creek || J. Broughton || — || align=right | 1.6 km || 
|-id=731 bgcolor=#E9E9E9
| 149731 ||  || — || May 19, 2004 || Kitt Peak || Spacewatch || — || align=right | 1.7 km || 
|-id=732 bgcolor=#fefefe
| 149732 ||  || — || May 23, 2004 || Kitt Peak || Spacewatch || — || align=right | 1.0 km || 
|-id=733 bgcolor=#E9E9E9
| 149733 ||  || — || June 11, 2004 || Socorro || LINEAR || — || align=right | 2.0 km || 
|-id=734 bgcolor=#d6d6d6
| 149734 ||  || — || June 12, 2004 || Socorro || LINEAR || — || align=right | 5.3 km || 
|-id=735 bgcolor=#d6d6d6
| 149735 ||  || — || June 10, 2004 || Campo Imperatore || CINEOS || — || align=right | 3.9 km || 
|-id=736 bgcolor=#E9E9E9
| 149736 ||  || — || June 12, 2004 || Socorro || LINEAR || EUN || align=right | 2.9 km || 
|-id=737 bgcolor=#E9E9E9
| 149737 ||  || — || June 14, 2004 || Kitt Peak || Spacewatch || HOF || align=right | 4.1 km || 
|-id=738 bgcolor=#d6d6d6
| 149738 ||  || — || July 9, 2004 || Siding Spring || SSS || TIR || align=right | 2.5 km || 
|-id=739 bgcolor=#fefefe
| 149739 ||  || — || July 9, 2004 || Socorro || LINEAR || NYS || align=right | 1.1 km || 
|-id=740 bgcolor=#d6d6d6
| 149740 ||  || — || July 11, 2004 || Socorro || LINEAR || — || align=right | 6.3 km || 
|-id=741 bgcolor=#d6d6d6
| 149741 ||  || — || July 11, 2004 || Socorro || LINEAR || EOS || align=right | 4.0 km || 
|-id=742 bgcolor=#d6d6d6
| 149742 ||  || — || July 11, 2004 || Socorro || LINEAR || — || align=right | 5.6 km || 
|-id=743 bgcolor=#d6d6d6
| 149743 ||  || — || July 11, 2004 || Socorro || LINEAR || — || align=right | 4.4 km || 
|-id=744 bgcolor=#d6d6d6
| 149744 ||  || — || July 11, 2004 || Socorro || LINEAR || — || align=right | 3.8 km || 
|-id=745 bgcolor=#d6d6d6
| 149745 ||  || — || July 11, 2004 || Socorro || LINEAR || 7:4 || align=right | 10 km || 
|-id=746 bgcolor=#d6d6d6
| 149746 ||  || — || July 9, 2004 || Anderson Mesa || LONEOS || — || align=right | 5.6 km || 
|-id=747 bgcolor=#d6d6d6
| 149747 ||  || — || July 16, 2004 || Socorro || LINEAR || — || align=right | 6.6 km || 
|-id=748 bgcolor=#d6d6d6
| 149748 ||  || — || July 16, 2004 || Socorro || LINEAR || — || align=right | 5.2 km || 
|-id=749 bgcolor=#E9E9E9
| 149749 ||  || — || July 16, 2004 || Socorro || LINEAR || GEF || align=right | 2.2 km || 
|-id=750 bgcolor=#E9E9E9
| 149750 ||  || — || July 16, 2004 || Socorro || LINEAR || — || align=right | 4.2 km || 
|-id=751 bgcolor=#d6d6d6
| 149751 ||  || — || July 16, 2004 || Socorro || LINEAR || — || align=right | 3.4 km || 
|-id=752 bgcolor=#E9E9E9
| 149752 ||  || — || July 21, 2004 || Reedy Creek || J. Broughton || — || align=right | 3.0 km || 
|-id=753 bgcolor=#d6d6d6
| 149753 ||  || — || August 7, 2004 || Palomar || NEAT || KOR || align=right | 2.3 km || 
|-id=754 bgcolor=#d6d6d6
| 149754 ||  || — || August 7, 2004 || Palomar || NEAT || — || align=right | 6.6 km || 
|-id=755 bgcolor=#d6d6d6
| 149755 ||  || — || August 8, 2004 || Anderson Mesa || LONEOS || — || align=right | 5.4 km || 
|-id=756 bgcolor=#E9E9E9
| 149756 ||  || — || August 5, 2004 || Palomar || NEAT || — || align=right | 3.2 km || 
|-id=757 bgcolor=#d6d6d6
| 149757 ||  || — || August 8, 2004 || Anderson Mesa || LONEOS || — || align=right | 5.3 km || 
|-id=758 bgcolor=#d6d6d6
| 149758 ||  || — || August 10, 2004 || Socorro || LINEAR || — || align=right | 5.7 km || 
|-id=759 bgcolor=#d6d6d6
| 149759 ||  || — || August 7, 2004 || Palomar || NEAT || — || align=right | 8.8 km || 
|-id=760 bgcolor=#E9E9E9
| 149760 ||  || — || August 8, 2004 || Socorro || LINEAR || — || align=right | 1.5 km || 
|-id=761 bgcolor=#d6d6d6
| 149761 ||  || — || August 8, 2004 || Socorro || LINEAR || — || align=right | 6.1 km || 
|-id=762 bgcolor=#d6d6d6
| 149762 ||  || — || August 8, 2004 || Socorro || LINEAR || — || align=right | 7.8 km || 
|-id=763 bgcolor=#d6d6d6
| 149763 ||  || — || August 8, 2004 || Palomar || NEAT || EOS || align=right | 3.5 km || 
|-id=764 bgcolor=#d6d6d6
| 149764 ||  || — || August 8, 2004 || Socorro || LINEAR || — || align=right | 8.3 km || 
|-id=765 bgcolor=#d6d6d6
| 149765 ||  || — || August 9, 2004 || Socorro || LINEAR || — || align=right | 3.6 km || 
|-id=766 bgcolor=#E9E9E9
| 149766 ||  || — || August 12, 2004 || Socorro || LINEAR || — || align=right | 3.4 km || 
|-id=767 bgcolor=#d6d6d6
| 149767 ||  || — || August 19, 2004 || Reedy Creek || J. Broughton || — || align=right | 5.1 km || 
|-id=768 bgcolor=#d6d6d6
| 149768 ||  || — || August 20, 2004 || Kitt Peak || Spacewatch || — || align=right | 3.6 km || 
|-id=769 bgcolor=#d6d6d6
| 149769 ||  || — || August 21, 2004 || Catalina || CSS || 7:4 || align=right | 6.7 km || 
|-id=770 bgcolor=#d6d6d6
| 149770 ||  || — || August 21, 2004 || Siding Spring || SSS || — || align=right | 5.6 km || 
|-id=771 bgcolor=#d6d6d6
| 149771 ||  || — || September 7, 2004 || Kitt Peak || Spacewatch || — || align=right | 4.0 km || 
|-id=772 bgcolor=#d6d6d6
| 149772 ||  || — || September 6, 2004 || Goodricke-Pigott || R. A. Tucker || — || align=right | 8.3 km || 
|-id=773 bgcolor=#d6d6d6
| 149773 ||  || — || September 7, 2004 || Socorro || LINEAR || — || align=right | 4.8 km || 
|-id=774 bgcolor=#d6d6d6
| 149774 ||  || — || September 9, 2004 || Socorro || LINEAR || 3:2 || align=right | 7.3 km || 
|-id=775 bgcolor=#d6d6d6
| 149775 ||  || — || September 7, 2004 || Kitt Peak || Spacewatch || — || align=right | 3.2 km || 
|-id=776 bgcolor=#d6d6d6
| 149776 ||  || — || September 10, 2004 || Socorro || LINEAR || SYL7:4 || align=right | 8.1 km || 
|-id=777 bgcolor=#d6d6d6
| 149777 ||  || — || September 11, 2004 || Socorro || LINEAR || — || align=right | 5.6 km || 
|-id=778 bgcolor=#d6d6d6
| 149778 ||  || — || September 11, 2004 || Socorro || LINEAR || — || align=right | 6.2 km || 
|-id=779 bgcolor=#d6d6d6
| 149779 ||  || — || September 6, 2004 || Palomar || NEAT || URS || align=right | 7.0 km || 
|-id=780 bgcolor=#d6d6d6
| 149780 ||  || — || September 15, 2004 || Kitt Peak || Spacewatch || — || align=right | 5.1 km || 
|-id=781 bgcolor=#d6d6d6
| 149781 ||  || — || September 13, 2004 || Socorro || LINEAR || — || align=right | 5.2 km || 
|-id=782 bgcolor=#d6d6d6
| 149782 ||  || — || September 9, 2004 || Anderson Mesa || LONEOS || TRP || align=right | 5.0 km || 
|-id=783 bgcolor=#d6d6d6
| 149783 ||  || — || October 5, 2004 || Kitt Peak || Spacewatch || THM || align=right | 4.7 km || 
|-id=784 bgcolor=#d6d6d6
| 149784 ||  || — || October 7, 2004 || Palomar || NEAT || — || align=right | 6.0 km || 
|-id=785 bgcolor=#E9E9E9
| 149785 ||  || — || January 16, 2005 || Socorro || LINEAR || — || align=right | 2.4 km || 
|-id=786 bgcolor=#fefefe
| 149786 ||  || — || March 3, 2005 || Catalina || CSS || — || align=right | 3.5 km || 
|-id=787 bgcolor=#fefefe
| 149787 ||  || — || March 10, 2005 || Goodricke-Pigott || R. A. Tucker || — || align=right | 1.2 km || 
|-id=788 bgcolor=#fefefe
| 149788 ||  || — || March 12, 2005 || Mount Lemmon || Mount Lemmon Survey || — || align=right | 1.2 km || 
|-id=789 bgcolor=#fefefe
| 149789 ||  || — || April 1, 2005 || Kitt Peak || Spacewatch || — || align=right | 1.2 km || 
|-id=790 bgcolor=#fefefe
| 149790 ||  || — || April 2, 2005 || Anderson Mesa || LONEOS || — || align=right | 1.3 km || 
|-id=791 bgcolor=#fefefe
| 149791 ||  || — || April 1, 2005 || Anderson Mesa || LONEOS || FLO || align=right | 1.1 km || 
|-id=792 bgcolor=#fefefe
| 149792 ||  || — || April 2, 2005 || Kitt Peak || Spacewatch || — || align=right | 1.2 km || 
|-id=793 bgcolor=#E9E9E9
| 149793 ||  || — || April 11, 2005 || Mount Lemmon || Mount Lemmon Survey || — || align=right | 1.2 km || 
|-id=794 bgcolor=#fefefe
| 149794 ||  || — || April 10, 2005 || Kitt Peak || Spacewatch || — || align=right | 1.5 km || 
|-id=795 bgcolor=#fefefe
| 149795 ||  || — || April 13, 2005 || Anderson Mesa || LONEOS || — || align=right | 1.2 km || 
|-id=796 bgcolor=#fefefe
| 149796 ||  || — || April 30, 2005 || Kitt Peak || Spacewatch || — || align=right data-sort-value="0.89" | 890 m || 
|-id=797 bgcolor=#fefefe
| 149797 ||  || — || May 3, 2005 || Socorro || LINEAR || NYS || align=right | 1.3 km || 
|-id=798 bgcolor=#fefefe
| 149798 ||  || — || May 4, 2005 || Kitt Peak || Spacewatch || — || align=right | 1.2 km || 
|-id=799 bgcolor=#fefefe
| 149799 ||  || — || May 6, 2005 || Catalina || CSS || H || align=right | 1.2 km || 
|-id=800 bgcolor=#E9E9E9
| 149800 ||  || — || May 10, 2005 || Kitt Peak || Spacewatch || — || align=right | 2.9 km || 
|}

149801–149900 

|-bgcolor=#d6d6d6
| 149801 ||  || — || May 14, 2005 || Kitt Peak || Spacewatch || — || align=right | 4.0 km || 
|-id=802 bgcolor=#fefefe
| 149802 ||  || — || May 3, 2005 || Kitt Peak || Spacewatch || NYS || align=right | 1.4 km || 
|-id=803 bgcolor=#d6d6d6
| 149803 ||  || — || May 16, 2005 || Mount Lemmon || Mount Lemmon Survey || — || align=right | 3.3 km || 
|-id=804 bgcolor=#fefefe
| 149804 ||  || — || May 22, 2005 || Palomar || NEAT || V || align=right data-sort-value="0.95" | 950 m || 
|-id=805 bgcolor=#E9E9E9
| 149805 ||  || — || June 4, 2005 || Kitt Peak || Spacewatch || — || align=right | 3.5 km || 
|-id=806 bgcolor=#fefefe
| 149806 ||  || — || June 8, 2005 || Kitt Peak || Spacewatch || FLO || align=right | 1.00 km || 
|-id=807 bgcolor=#fefefe
| 149807 ||  || — || June 10, 2005 || Kitt Peak || Spacewatch || V || align=right | 1.1 km || 
|-id=808 bgcolor=#fefefe
| 149808 ||  || — || June 10, 2005 || Kitt Peak || Spacewatch || NYS || align=right data-sort-value="0.82" | 820 m || 
|-id=809 bgcolor=#fefefe
| 149809 ||  || — || June 26, 2005 || Mount Lemmon || Mount Lemmon Survey || H || align=right | 1.1 km || 
|-id=810 bgcolor=#fefefe
| 149810 ||  || — || June 17, 2005 || Mount Lemmon || Mount Lemmon Survey || NYS || align=right | 1.1 km || 
|-id=811 bgcolor=#d6d6d6
| 149811 ||  || — || June 28, 2005 || Kitt Peak || Spacewatch || — || align=right | 3.2 km || 
|-id=812 bgcolor=#E9E9E9
| 149812 ||  || — || June 28, 2005 || Palomar || NEAT || — || align=right | 1.5 km || 
|-id=813 bgcolor=#fefefe
| 149813 ||  || — || June 28, 2005 || Palomar || NEAT || — || align=right | 1.4 km || 
|-id=814 bgcolor=#d6d6d6
| 149814 ||  || — || June 29, 2005 || Palomar || NEAT || — || align=right | 4.4 km || 
|-id=815 bgcolor=#fefefe
| 149815 ||  || — || June 29, 2005 || Palomar || NEAT || — || align=right | 2.6 km || 
|-id=816 bgcolor=#d6d6d6
| 149816 ||  || — || June 30, 2005 || Kitt Peak || Spacewatch || — || align=right | 4.8 km || 
|-id=817 bgcolor=#E9E9E9
| 149817 ||  || — || June 30, 2005 || Kitt Peak || Spacewatch || — || align=right | 1.5 km || 
|-id=818 bgcolor=#E9E9E9
| 149818 ||  || — || June 29, 2005 || Palomar || NEAT || — || align=right | 1.7 km || 
|-id=819 bgcolor=#d6d6d6
| 149819 || 2005 NJ || — || July 1, 2005 || Anderson Mesa || LONEOS || TIR || align=right | 4.9 km || 
|-id=820 bgcolor=#fefefe
| 149820 || 2005 NY || — || July 1, 2005 || Catalina || CSS || — || align=right | 1.6 km || 
|-id=821 bgcolor=#fefefe
| 149821 ||  || — || July 1, 2005 || Kitt Peak || Spacewatch || FLO || align=right | 1.7 km || 
|-id=822 bgcolor=#fefefe
| 149822 ||  || — || July 3, 2005 || Mount Lemmon || Mount Lemmon Survey || — || align=right | 1.6 km || 
|-id=823 bgcolor=#fefefe
| 149823 ||  || — || July 5, 2005 || Mount Lemmon || Mount Lemmon Survey || — || align=right data-sort-value="0.86" | 860 m || 
|-id=824 bgcolor=#fefefe
| 149824 ||  || — || July 4, 2005 || Kitt Peak || Spacewatch || ERI || align=right | 2.6 km || 
|-id=825 bgcolor=#fefefe
| 149825 ||  || — || July 7, 2005 || Reedy Creek || J. Broughton || — || align=right | 1.7 km || 
|-id=826 bgcolor=#E9E9E9
| 149826 ||  || — || July 7, 2005 || Reedy Creek || J. Broughton || — || align=right | 1.9 km || 
|-id=827 bgcolor=#E9E9E9
| 149827 ||  || — || July 6, 2005 || Kitt Peak || Spacewatch || — || align=right | 2.3 km || 
|-id=828 bgcolor=#fefefe
| 149828 ||  || — || July 11, 2005 || Mount Lemmon || Mount Lemmon Survey || NYS || align=right | 1.0 km || 
|-id=829 bgcolor=#fefefe
| 149829 ||  || — || July 1, 2005 || Kitt Peak || Spacewatch || — || align=right | 1.1 km || 
|-id=830 bgcolor=#fefefe
| 149830 ||  || — || July 10, 2005 || Catalina || CSS || — || align=right | 1.7 km || 
|-id=831 bgcolor=#d6d6d6
| 149831 ||  || — || July 12, 2005 || Catalina || CSS || LIX || align=right | 5.5 km || 
|-id=832 bgcolor=#fefefe
| 149832 ||  || — || July 28, 2005 || Palomar || NEAT || NYS || align=right | 1.3 km || 
|-id=833 bgcolor=#fefefe
| 149833 ||  || — || July 28, 2005 || Palomar || NEAT || V || align=right | 1.0 km || 
|-id=834 bgcolor=#fefefe
| 149834 ||  || — || July 31, 2005 || Siding Spring || SSS || NYS || align=right | 1.1 km || 
|-id=835 bgcolor=#E9E9E9
| 149835 ||  || — || July 29, 2005 || Palomar || NEAT || — || align=right | 2.2 km || 
|-id=836 bgcolor=#fefefe
| 149836 ||  || — || July 28, 2005 || Palomar || NEAT || — || align=right | 1.5 km || 
|-id=837 bgcolor=#fefefe
| 149837 ||  || — || July 28, 2005 || Palomar || NEAT || V || align=right | 1.3 km || 
|-id=838 bgcolor=#fefefe
| 149838 ||  || — || July 29, 2005 || Palomar || NEAT || — || align=right | 1.5 km || 
|-id=839 bgcolor=#d6d6d6
| 149839 ||  || — || July 31, 2005 || Palomar || NEAT || — || align=right | 2.6 km || 
|-id=840 bgcolor=#fefefe
| 149840 ||  || — || August 1, 2005 || Siding Spring || SSS || V || align=right | 1.0 km || 
|-id=841 bgcolor=#fefefe
| 149841 ||  || — || August 2, 2005 || Socorro || LINEAR || — || align=right | 1.4 km || 
|-id=842 bgcolor=#fefefe
| 149842 ||  || — || August 9, 2005 || Reedy Creek || J. Broughton || — || align=right | 1.9 km || 
|-id=843 bgcolor=#fefefe
| 149843 ||  || — || August 4, 2005 || Palomar || NEAT || — || align=right | 1.3 km || 
|-id=844 bgcolor=#E9E9E9
| 149844 ||  || — || August 8, 2005 || Siding Spring || SSS || — || align=right | 2.6 km || 
|-id=845 bgcolor=#E9E9E9
| 149845 ||  || — || August 15, 2005 || Reedy Creek || J. Broughton || — || align=right | 2.7 km || 
|-id=846 bgcolor=#fefefe
| 149846 ||  || — || August 15, 2005 || Siding Spring || SSS || — || align=right | 1.8 km || 
|-id=847 bgcolor=#E9E9E9
| 149847 ||  || — || August 22, 2005 || Palomar || NEAT || — || align=right | 1.6 km || 
|-id=848 bgcolor=#fefefe
| 149848 ||  || — || August 24, 2005 || Palomar || NEAT || — || align=right | 1.3 km || 
|-id=849 bgcolor=#d6d6d6
| 149849 ||  || — || August 24, 2005 || Palomar || NEAT || — || align=right | 3.0 km || 
|-id=850 bgcolor=#fefefe
| 149850 ||  || — || August 25, 2005 || Palomar || NEAT || MAS || align=right | 1.3 km || 
|-id=851 bgcolor=#E9E9E9
| 149851 ||  || — || August 24, 2005 || Palomar || NEAT || — || align=right | 3.0 km || 
|-id=852 bgcolor=#d6d6d6
| 149852 ||  || — || August 25, 2005 || Campo Imperatore || CINEOS || 7:4 || align=right | 5.5 km || 
|-id=853 bgcolor=#fefefe
| 149853 ||  || — || August 27, 2005 || Kitt Peak || Spacewatch || NYS || align=right | 3.0 km || 
|-id=854 bgcolor=#fefefe
| 149854 ||  || — || August 22, 2005 || Palomar || NEAT || — || align=right | 1.2 km || 
|-id=855 bgcolor=#fefefe
| 149855 ||  || — || August 26, 2005 || Anderson Mesa || LONEOS || FLO || align=right | 1.2 km || 
|-id=856 bgcolor=#fefefe
| 149856 ||  || — || August 26, 2005 || Palomar || NEAT || — || align=right data-sort-value="0.99" | 990 m || 
|-id=857 bgcolor=#fefefe
| 149857 ||  || — || August 27, 2005 || Siding Spring || SSS || NYS || align=right | 1.2 km || 
|-id=858 bgcolor=#fefefe
| 149858 ||  || — || August 28, 2005 || Kitt Peak || Spacewatch || — || align=right | 1.2 km || 
|-id=859 bgcolor=#d6d6d6
| 149859 ||  || — || August 28, 2005 || Anderson Mesa || LONEOS || THM || align=right | 3.6 km || 
|-id=860 bgcolor=#E9E9E9
| 149860 ||  || — || August 28, 2005 || Kitt Peak || Spacewatch || — || align=right | 3.4 km || 
|-id=861 bgcolor=#E9E9E9
| 149861 ||  || — || August 26, 2005 || Palomar || NEAT || — || align=right | 3.2 km || 
|-id=862 bgcolor=#E9E9E9
| 149862 ||  || — || August 29, 2005 || Kitt Peak || Spacewatch || — || align=right | 3.1 km || 
|-id=863 bgcolor=#E9E9E9
| 149863 ||  || — || August 29, 2005 || Anderson Mesa || LONEOS || — || align=right | 3.6 km || 
|-id=864 bgcolor=#fefefe
| 149864 ||  || — || August 29, 2005 || Anderson Mesa || LONEOS || — || align=right | 1.3 km || 
|-id=865 bgcolor=#E9E9E9
| 149865 Michelhernandez ||  ||  || August 29, 2005 || Saint-Véran || Saint-Véran Obs. || MIS || align=right | 3.7 km || 
|-id=866 bgcolor=#E9E9E9
| 149866 ||  || — || August 25, 2005 || Palomar || NEAT || AGN || align=right | 1.8 km || 
|-id=867 bgcolor=#fefefe
| 149867 ||  || — || August 25, 2005 || Palomar || NEAT || — || align=right | 1.1 km || 
|-id=868 bgcolor=#fefefe
| 149868 ||  || — || August 27, 2005 || Palomar || NEAT || NYS || align=right | 1.1 km || 
|-id=869 bgcolor=#fefefe
| 149869 ||  || — || August 27, 2005 || Palomar || NEAT || — || align=right | 1.2 km || 
|-id=870 bgcolor=#E9E9E9
| 149870 ||  || — || August 28, 2005 || Kitt Peak || Spacewatch || — || align=right | 1.3 km || 
|-id=871 bgcolor=#E9E9E9
| 149871 ||  || — || August 28, 2005 || Kitt Peak || Spacewatch || HEN || align=right | 1.2 km || 
|-id=872 bgcolor=#d6d6d6
| 149872 ||  || — || August 28, 2005 || Kitt Peak || Spacewatch || THM || align=right | 3.1 km || 
|-id=873 bgcolor=#d6d6d6
| 149873 ||  || — || August 26, 2005 || Palomar || NEAT || — || align=right | 5.4 km || 
|-id=874 bgcolor=#E9E9E9
| 149874 ||  || — || August 28, 2005 || Siding Spring || SSS || WIT || align=right | 1.6 km || 
|-id=875 bgcolor=#E9E9E9
| 149875 ||  || — || August 31, 2005 || Socorro || LINEAR || — || align=right | 5.0 km || 
|-id=876 bgcolor=#d6d6d6
| 149876 ||  || — || August 30, 2005 || Palomar || NEAT || — || align=right | 3.1 km || 
|-id=877 bgcolor=#E9E9E9
| 149877 ||  || — || August 26, 2005 || Palomar || NEAT || — || align=right | 2.5 km || 
|-id=878 bgcolor=#E9E9E9
| 149878 ||  || — || August 31, 2005 || Palomar || NEAT || — || align=right | 2.2 km || 
|-id=879 bgcolor=#fefefe
| 149879 ||  || — || August 28, 2005 || Anderson Mesa || LONEOS || NYS || align=right | 1.3 km || 
|-id=880 bgcolor=#E9E9E9
| 149880 ||  || — || August 29, 2005 || Palomar || NEAT || — || align=right | 2.1 km || 
|-id=881 bgcolor=#fefefe
| 149881 || 2005 RZ || — || September 1, 2005 || Socorro || LINEAR || — || align=right | 4.4 km || 
|-id=882 bgcolor=#E9E9E9
| 149882 ||  || — || September 6, 2005 || Bergisch Gladbach || W. Bickel || — || align=right | 2.1 km || 
|-id=883 bgcolor=#fefefe
| 149883 ||  || — || September 1, 2005 || Siding Spring || SSS || PHO || align=right | 1.8 km || 
|-id=884 bgcolor=#d6d6d6
| 149884 Radebeul ||  ||  || September 9, 2005 || Radebeul || M. Fiedler || — || align=right | 5.0 km || 
|-id=885 bgcolor=#d6d6d6
| 149885 ||  || — || September 11, 2005 || Junk Bond || D. Healy || KOR || align=right | 1.9 km || 
|-id=886 bgcolor=#E9E9E9
| 149886 ||  || — || September 1, 2005 || Palomar || NEAT || GEF || align=right | 2.1 km || 
|-id=887 bgcolor=#d6d6d6
| 149887 ||  || — || September 6, 2005 || Socorro || LINEAR || — || align=right | 3.7 km || 
|-id=888 bgcolor=#fefefe
| 149888 ||  || — || September 9, 2005 || Socorro || LINEAR || — || align=right | 1.5 km || 
|-id=889 bgcolor=#E9E9E9
| 149889 ||  || — || September 10, 2005 || Anderson Mesa || LONEOS || — || align=right | 3.0 km || 
|-id=890 bgcolor=#E9E9E9
| 149890 ||  || — || September 10, 2005 || Anderson Mesa || LONEOS || — || align=right | 1.8 km || 
|-id=891 bgcolor=#E9E9E9
| 149891 ||  || — || September 10, 2005 || Anderson Mesa || LONEOS || ADE || align=right | 5.3 km || 
|-id=892 bgcolor=#E9E9E9
| 149892 ||  || — || September 11, 2005 || Socorro || LINEAR || — || align=right | 3.6 km || 
|-id=893 bgcolor=#fefefe
| 149893 ||  || — || September 9, 2005 || Socorro || LINEAR || — || align=right | 3.3 km || 
|-id=894 bgcolor=#E9E9E9
| 149894 ||  || — || September 14, 2005 || Catalina || CSS || — || align=right | 3.6 km || 
|-id=895 bgcolor=#E9E9E9
| 149895 ||  || — || September 14, 2005 || Catalina || CSS || — || align=right | 3.8 km || 
|-id=896 bgcolor=#d6d6d6
| 149896 ||  || — || September 23, 2005 || Junk Bond || D. Healy || — || align=right | 3.5 km || 
|-id=897 bgcolor=#E9E9E9
| 149897 ||  || — || September 24, 2005 || Kitt Peak || Spacewatch || HEN || align=right | 1.7 km || 
|-id=898 bgcolor=#d6d6d6
| 149898 ||  || — || September 25, 2005 || Catalina || CSS || — || align=right | 6.1 km || 
|-id=899 bgcolor=#fefefe
| 149899 ||  || — || September 23, 2005 || Kitt Peak || Spacewatch || — || align=right | 1.1 km || 
|-id=900 bgcolor=#E9E9E9
| 149900 ||  || — || September 24, 2005 || Anderson Mesa || LONEOS || WIT || align=right | 1.7 km || 
|}

149901–150000 

|-bgcolor=#d6d6d6
| 149901 ||  || — || September 23, 2005 || Kitt Peak || Spacewatch || KOR || align=right | 2.2 km || 
|-id=902 bgcolor=#d6d6d6
| 149902 ||  || — || September 23, 2005 || Kitt Peak || Spacewatch || EOS || align=right | 4.3 km || 
|-id=903 bgcolor=#E9E9E9
| 149903 ||  || — || September 24, 2005 || Kitt Peak || Spacewatch || — || align=right | 4.1 km || 
|-id=904 bgcolor=#d6d6d6
| 149904 ||  || — || September 24, 2005 || Kitt Peak || Spacewatch || — || align=right | 3.5 km || 
|-id=905 bgcolor=#E9E9E9
| 149905 ||  || — || September 24, 2005 || Kitt Peak || Spacewatch || — || align=right | 1.5 km || 
|-id=906 bgcolor=#E9E9E9
| 149906 ||  || — || September 24, 2005 || Kitt Peak || Spacewatch || GEF || align=right | 2.1 km || 
|-id=907 bgcolor=#fefefe
| 149907 ||  || — || September 24, 2005 || Kitt Peak || Spacewatch || NYS || align=right | 1.0 km || 
|-id=908 bgcolor=#d6d6d6
| 149908 ||  || — || September 24, 2005 || Kitt Peak || Spacewatch || KAR || align=right | 1.6 km || 
|-id=909 bgcolor=#d6d6d6
| 149909 ||  || — || September 25, 2005 || Kitt Peak || Spacewatch || — || align=right | 5.5 km || 
|-id=910 bgcolor=#d6d6d6
| 149910 ||  || — || September 26, 2005 || Catalina || CSS || — || align=right | 9.6 km || 
|-id=911 bgcolor=#E9E9E9
| 149911 ||  || — || September 27, 2005 || Kitt Peak || Spacewatch || — || align=right | 1.3 km || 
|-id=912 bgcolor=#d6d6d6
| 149912 ||  || — || September 23, 2005 || Kitt Peak || Spacewatch || — || align=right | 6.7 km || 
|-id=913 bgcolor=#fefefe
| 149913 ||  || — || September 23, 2005 || Catalina || CSS || — || align=right | 2.2 km || 
|-id=914 bgcolor=#d6d6d6
| 149914 ||  || — || September 24, 2005 || Kitt Peak || Spacewatch || — || align=right | 2.7 km || 
|-id=915 bgcolor=#E9E9E9
| 149915 ||  || — || September 24, 2005 || Kitt Peak || Spacewatch || — || align=right | 1.4 km || 
|-id=916 bgcolor=#E9E9E9
| 149916 ||  || — || September 25, 2005 || Kitt Peak || Spacewatch || — || align=right | 2.1 km || 
|-id=917 bgcolor=#E9E9E9
| 149917 ||  || — || September 25, 2005 || Kitt Peak || Spacewatch || — || align=right | 3.3 km || 
|-id=918 bgcolor=#E9E9E9
| 149918 ||  || — || September 25, 2005 || Palomar || NEAT || — || align=right | 2.9 km || 
|-id=919 bgcolor=#d6d6d6
| 149919 ||  || — || September 26, 2005 || Kitt Peak || Spacewatch || — || align=right | 3.5 km || 
|-id=920 bgcolor=#E9E9E9
| 149920 ||  || — || September 26, 2005 || Palomar || NEAT || — || align=right | 2.9 km || 
|-id=921 bgcolor=#d6d6d6
| 149921 ||  || — || September 26, 2005 || Palomar || NEAT || — || align=right | 4.8 km || 
|-id=922 bgcolor=#d6d6d6
| 149922 ||  || — || September 26, 2005 || Palomar || NEAT || — || align=right | 3.5 km || 
|-id=923 bgcolor=#E9E9E9
| 149923 ||  || — || September 27, 2005 || Kitt Peak || Spacewatch || — || align=right | 2.0 km || 
|-id=924 bgcolor=#E9E9E9
| 149924 ||  || — || September 27, 2005 || Kingsnake || J. V. McClusky || WIT || align=right | 1.5 km || 
|-id=925 bgcolor=#E9E9E9
| 149925 ||  || — || September 28, 2005 || Palomar || NEAT || — || align=right | 2.6 km || 
|-id=926 bgcolor=#fefefe
| 149926 ||  || — || September 29, 2005 || Kitt Peak || Spacewatch || — || align=right | 1.3 km || 
|-id=927 bgcolor=#E9E9E9
| 149927 ||  || — || September 29, 2005 || Palomar || NEAT || — || align=right | 2.5 km || 
|-id=928 bgcolor=#E9E9E9
| 149928 ||  || — || September 25, 2005 || Kitt Peak || Spacewatch || HEN || align=right | 1.5 km || 
|-id=929 bgcolor=#E9E9E9
| 149929 ||  || — || September 25, 2005 || Kitt Peak || Spacewatch || — || align=right | 1.4 km || 
|-id=930 bgcolor=#d6d6d6
| 149930 ||  || — || September 25, 2005 || Palomar || NEAT || EOS || align=right | 4.3 km || 
|-id=931 bgcolor=#fefefe
| 149931 ||  || — || September 26, 2005 || Kitt Peak || Spacewatch || NYS || align=right | 1.2 km || 
|-id=932 bgcolor=#d6d6d6
| 149932 ||  || — || September 28, 2005 || Palomar || NEAT || — || align=right | 6.2 km || 
|-id=933 bgcolor=#d6d6d6
| 149933 ||  || — || September 29, 2005 || Anderson Mesa || LONEOS || CHA || align=right | 3.0 km || 
|-id=934 bgcolor=#d6d6d6
| 149934 ||  || — || September 29, 2005 || Palomar || NEAT || HYG || align=right | 5.3 km || 
|-id=935 bgcolor=#E9E9E9
| 149935 ||  || — || September 29, 2005 || Kitt Peak || Spacewatch || — || align=right | 2.4 km || 
|-id=936 bgcolor=#fefefe
| 149936 ||  || — || September 30, 2005 || Catalina || CSS || V || align=right | 1.3 km || 
|-id=937 bgcolor=#d6d6d6
| 149937 ||  || — || September 30, 2005 || Socorro || LINEAR || EOS || align=right | 4.7 km || 
|-id=938 bgcolor=#fefefe
| 149938 ||  || — || September 30, 2005 || Palomar || NEAT || FLO || align=right | 2.0 km || 
|-id=939 bgcolor=#E9E9E9
| 149939 ||  || — || September 30, 2005 || Palomar || NEAT || HEN || align=right | 2.1 km || 
|-id=940 bgcolor=#E9E9E9
| 149940 ||  || — || September 26, 2005 || Palomar || NEAT || — || align=right | 2.3 km || 
|-id=941 bgcolor=#d6d6d6
| 149941 ||  || — || September 30, 2005 || Mount Lemmon || Mount Lemmon Survey || — || align=right | 3.2 km || 
|-id=942 bgcolor=#d6d6d6
| 149942 ||  || — || September 30, 2005 || Mount Lemmon || Mount Lemmon Survey || KAR || align=right | 1.7 km || 
|-id=943 bgcolor=#fefefe
| 149943 ||  || — || September 23, 2005 || Catalina || CSS || V || align=right | 1.1 km || 
|-id=944 bgcolor=#E9E9E9
| 149944 ||  || — || September 23, 2005 || Catalina || CSS || — || align=right | 1.3 km || 
|-id=945 bgcolor=#d6d6d6
| 149945 ||  || — || September 23, 2005 || Kitt Peak || Spacewatch || EOS || align=right | 6.4 km || 
|-id=946 bgcolor=#E9E9E9
| 149946 ||  || — || September 24, 2005 || Palomar || NEAT || — || align=right | 3.6 km || 
|-id=947 bgcolor=#E9E9E9
| 149947 ||  || — || September 22, 2005 || Palomar || NEAT || — || align=right | 2.1 km || 
|-id=948 bgcolor=#E9E9E9
| 149948 ||  || — || October 1, 2005 || Mount Lemmon || Mount Lemmon Survey || — || align=right | 2.8 km || 
|-id=949 bgcolor=#E9E9E9
| 149949 ||  || — || October 1, 2005 || Kitt Peak || Spacewatch || — || align=right | 3.4 km || 
|-id=950 bgcolor=#fefefe
| 149950 ||  || — || October 1, 2005 || Socorro || LINEAR || V || align=right | 1.2 km || 
|-id=951 bgcolor=#fefefe
| 149951 Hildakowalski ||  ||  || October 3, 2005 || Catalina || CSS || — || align=right | 1.4 km || 
|-id=952 bgcolor=#fefefe
| 149952 Susanhamann ||  ||  || October 1, 2005 || Catalina || R. A. Kowalski || — || align=right | 1.4 km || 
|-id=953 bgcolor=#E9E9E9
| 149953 ||  || — || October 1, 2005 || Socorro || LINEAR || HOF || align=right | 5.0 km || 
|-id=954 bgcolor=#d6d6d6
| 149954 ||  || — || October 9, 2005 || Junk Bond || D. Healy || KOR || align=right | 2.0 km || 
|-id=955 bgcolor=#fefefe
| 149955 Maron ||  ||  || October 9, 2005 || Hormersdorf || J. Lorenz || LCI || align=right | 1.6 km || 
|-id=956 bgcolor=#d6d6d6
| 149956 ||  || — || October 1, 2005 || Mount Lemmon || Mount Lemmon Survey || — || align=right | 3.4 km || 
|-id=957 bgcolor=#d6d6d6
| 149957 ||  || — || October 4, 2005 || Palomar || NEAT || — || align=right | 5.4 km || 
|-id=958 bgcolor=#E9E9E9
| 149958 ||  || — || October 7, 2005 || Anderson Mesa || LONEOS || PAD || align=right | 2.9 km || 
|-id=959 bgcolor=#d6d6d6
| 149959 ||  || — || October 7, 2005 || Anderson Mesa || LONEOS || EOS || align=right | 3.6 km || 
|-id=960 bgcolor=#d6d6d6
| 149960 ||  || — || October 6, 2005 || Mount Lemmon || Mount Lemmon Survey || KOR || align=right | 2.0 km || 
|-id=961 bgcolor=#d6d6d6
| 149961 ||  || — || October 5, 2005 || Mount Lemmon || Mount Lemmon Survey || KOR || align=right | 2.3 km || 
|-id=962 bgcolor=#E9E9E9
| 149962 ||  || — || October 6, 2005 || Anderson Mesa || LONEOS || — || align=right | 4.2 km || 
|-id=963 bgcolor=#fefefe
| 149963 ||  || — || October 8, 2005 || Socorro || LINEAR || V || align=right | 1.1 km || 
|-id=964 bgcolor=#d6d6d6
| 149964 ||  || — || October 8, 2005 || Socorro || LINEAR || — || align=right | 2.9 km || 
|-id=965 bgcolor=#d6d6d6
| 149965 ||  || — || October 8, 2005 || Socorro || LINEAR || — || align=right | 4.7 km || 
|-id=966 bgcolor=#d6d6d6
| 149966 ||  || — || October 4, 2005 || Mount Lemmon || Mount Lemmon Survey || — || align=right | 3.6 km || 
|-id=967 bgcolor=#d6d6d6
| 149967 ||  || — || October 7, 2005 || Kitt Peak || Spacewatch || — || align=right | 5.3 km || 
|-id=968 bgcolor=#E9E9E9
| 149968 Trondal ||  ||  || October 11, 2005 || Nogales || Tenagra II Obs. || — || align=right | 2.2 km || 
|-id=969 bgcolor=#d6d6d6
| 149969 ||  || — || October 8, 2005 || Socorro || LINEAR || — || align=right | 2.8 km || 
|-id=970 bgcolor=#E9E9E9
| 149970 ||  || — || October 9, 2005 || Kitt Peak || Spacewatch || PAD || align=right | 2.1 km || 
|-id=971 bgcolor=#E9E9E9
| 149971 ||  || — || October 9, 2005 || Kitt Peak || Spacewatch || — || align=right | 2.6 km || 
|-id=972 bgcolor=#d6d6d6
| 149972 ||  || — || October 1, 2005 || Anderson Mesa || LONEOS || HYG || align=right | 4.9 km || 
|-id=973 bgcolor=#E9E9E9
| 149973 ||  || — || October 9, 2005 || Catalina || CSS || — || align=right | 1.7 km || 
|-id=974 bgcolor=#d6d6d6
| 149974 ||  || — || October 4, 2005 || Catalina || CSS || SYL7:4 || align=right | 7.0 km || 
|-id=975 bgcolor=#d6d6d6
| 149975 ||  || — || October 22, 2005 || Junk Bond || D. Healy || — || align=right | 3.7 km || 
|-id=976 bgcolor=#d6d6d6
| 149976 ||  || — || October 24, 2005 || Wrightwood || J. W. Young || — || align=right | 4.9 km || 
|-id=977 bgcolor=#E9E9E9
| 149977 ||  || — || October 21, 2005 || Palomar || NEAT || — || align=right | 1.7 km || 
|-id=978 bgcolor=#E9E9E9
| 149978 ||  || — || October 21, 2005 || Palomar || NEAT || — || align=right | 3.0 km || 
|-id=979 bgcolor=#E9E9E9
| 149979 ||  || — || October 21, 2005 || Palomar || NEAT || — || align=right | 4.0 km || 
|-id=980 bgcolor=#E9E9E9
| 149980 ||  || — || October 22, 2005 || Kitt Peak || Spacewatch || — || align=right | 4.7 km || 
|-id=981 bgcolor=#E9E9E9
| 149981 ||  || — || October 23, 2005 || Kitt Peak || Spacewatch || — || align=right | 2.0 km || 
|-id=982 bgcolor=#d6d6d6
| 149982 ||  || — || October 23, 2005 || Kitt Peak || Spacewatch || KOR || align=right | 2.6 km || 
|-id=983 bgcolor=#d6d6d6
| 149983 ||  || — || October 23, 2005 || Catalina || CSS || — || align=right | 5.2 km || 
|-id=984 bgcolor=#E9E9E9
| 149984 ||  || — || October 24, 2005 || Anderson Mesa || LONEOS || — || align=right | 1.8 km || 
|-id=985 bgcolor=#E9E9E9
| 149985 ||  || — || October 24, 2005 || Anderson Mesa || LONEOS || — || align=right | 1.6 km || 
|-id=986 bgcolor=#d6d6d6
| 149986 ||  || — || October 24, 2005 || Kitt Peak || Spacewatch || — || align=right | 4.1 km || 
|-id=987 bgcolor=#d6d6d6
| 149987 ||  || — || October 25, 2005 || Mount Lemmon || Mount Lemmon Survey || KOR || align=right | 2.1 km || 
|-id=988 bgcolor=#d6d6d6
| 149988 ||  || — || October 25, 2005 || Catalina || CSS || — || align=right | 3.2 km || 
|-id=989 bgcolor=#d6d6d6
| 149989 ||  || — || October 22, 2005 || Palomar || NEAT || — || align=right | 5.5 km || 
|-id=990 bgcolor=#E9E9E9
| 149990 ||  || — || October 22, 2005 || Palomar || NEAT || — || align=right | 3.1 km || 
|-id=991 bgcolor=#E9E9E9
| 149991 ||  || — || October 23, 2005 || Catalina || CSS || — || align=right | 2.9 km || 
|-id=992 bgcolor=#E9E9E9
| 149992 ||  || — || October 23, 2005 || Catalina || CSS || AER || align=right | 2.5 km || 
|-id=993 bgcolor=#d6d6d6
| 149993 ||  || — || October 23, 2005 || Palomar || NEAT || — || align=right | 5.3 km || 
|-id=994 bgcolor=#d6d6d6
| 149994 ||  || — || October 23, 2005 || Palomar || NEAT || — || align=right | 5.9 km || 
|-id=995 bgcolor=#E9E9E9
| 149995 ||  || — || October 24, 2005 || Palomar || NEAT || — || align=right | 3.5 km || 
|-id=996 bgcolor=#d6d6d6
| 149996 ||  || — || October 22, 2005 || Catalina || CSS || — || align=right | 4.4 km || 
|-id=997 bgcolor=#d6d6d6
| 149997 ||  || — || October 24, 2005 || Kitt Peak || Spacewatch || — || align=right | 5.2 km || 
|-id=998 bgcolor=#E9E9E9
| 149998 ||  || — || October 24, 2005 || Palomar || NEAT || EUN || align=right | 2.5 km || 
|-id=999 bgcolor=#d6d6d6
| 149999 ||  || — || October 24, 2005 || Palomar || NEAT || FIR || align=right | 9.5 km || 
|-id=000 bgcolor=#d6d6d6
| 150000 ||  || — || October 25, 2005 || Catalina || CSS || — || align=right | 5.0 km || 
|}

References

External links 
 Discovery Circumstances: Numbered Minor Planets (145001)–(150000) (IAU Minor Planet Center)

0149